This article lists compositions written for the viola. The list includes works in which the viola is a featured instrument: viola solo, viola and piano, viola and orchestra, ensemble of violas, etc.  Catalogue number, date of composition and publisher (for copyrighted works) are also included. Ordering is by composer surname.

This pages lists composers whose surname falls into the A to B alphabetic range. For others, see respective pages:
 List of compositions for viola: C to E
 List of compositions for viola: F to H
 List of compositions for viola: I to K
 List of compositions for viola: L to N
 List of compositions for viola: O to R
 List of compositions for viola: S
 List of compositions for viola: T to Z

A
 Erkki Aaltonen (1910–1990) 
     Preludi ja allegro (Prelude and Allegro) for viola and piano (1983); Julkaisija Erkki Aaltone
 Walter Abendroth (1896–1973)
     Concerto for viola and orchestra
     Divertimento for flute and viola, Op. 5 (1928); Willy Müller Süddeutscher Musikverlag
     Sonata No. 1 in G for viola and piano, Op. 21a (1956); Willy Müller Süddeutscher Musikverlag
     Sonata No. 2 in C for viola and piano, Op. 21b (1957); Willy Müller Süddeutscher Musikverlag
 Hans Abrahamsen (b. 1952)
     Hymne for cello or viola solo (1990); Edition Wilhelm Hansen
 Jean Absil (1893–1974)
     Berceuse for cello or viola or alto saxophone and small orchestra (or piano) (1932); Gervan Édition Musicale; CeBeDeM
     Concertino for viola and orchestra, Op. 122 (1964); CeBeDeM
     Concerto for viola and orchestra, Op. 54 (1942); CeBeDeM
     Sonatine en duo for violin and viola, Op. 112 (1962); CeBeDeM
 Joseph Achron (1886–1943)
     2 Pieces for viola and piano, Op. 65 (1932); Israeli Music Publications
 Dieter Acker (1940–2006)
     Arkaden II for viola and piano (1995)
     Duo for viola and cello (1973); Bote & Bock; Boosey & Hawkes
     Equale II for 2 violas (1987)
     Musik for viola, harp and string orchestra (1992); Ries & Erler Musikverlag
     Sonata for viola and harp (1987); Ries & Erler Musikverlag
     Sonata for viola and piano (1985); Bote & Bock; Boosey & Hawkes
     Trio for flute, viola and harp (or guitar) (1987)
     Trio for clarinet, viola and piano (1992)
 Selman Ada (b. 1953)
     2 Konser Prelüdü (2 Concert Preludes) for flute, viola and harp (2002); Strube Verlag
 Byron Adams (b. 1955)
     Sonata for viola and piano (2010–2011); Editions Bim
 Murray Adaskin (1906–2002)
     Concerto No. 1 for viola and orchestra (1991); AdLar Publications; Canadian Music Centre
     Concerto No. 2 for viola and orchestra (1995); AdLar Publications; Canadian Music Centre
     Duo for viola and guitar (1996); AdLar Publications; Canadian Music Centre
     Duo for viola and piano (1999); AdLar Publications; Canadian Music Centre
     Finki, Where Are You? for 2 violas (2000); AdLar Publications
     Sonatine Baroque for solo viola (1952, 1999); AdLar Publications
     Vocalise No. 1 for solo viola (1990); Canadian Music Centre
     Vocalise No. 2 for solo viola (1996); Canadian Music Centre
 Thomas Adès (b. 1971)
     Four Berceuses from The Exterminating Angel for clarinet, viola and piano (2021); Faber Music
     Three Berceuses from The Exterminating Angel for viola and piano (2018); Faber Music
 Samuel Adler (b. 1928)
     Canto XVI for viola solo (2004); Ludwig Music Publishing
     Concerto for viola and orchestra (1999); Theodore Presser
     Divertissement for viola and marimba (2002); Theodore Presser
     Five Choral Scherzi for mixed chorus, viola and guitar (2007); Theodore Presser
     Into the Radient  Boundaries of Light for viola and guitar (1993); Theodore Presser
     Sonata for viola and piano (1984); Theodore Presser
     Song and Dance for viola and orchestra (1961); Oxford University Press
     Triolet for flute, viola and harp (1989); C.F. Peters
 Bruce Adolphe (b. 1955)
     Dreamsong for viola and piano (1989); American Composers Alliance
     Duo for viola and piano (1980); American Composers Alliance
     Hoodoo Duo for viola and double bass (1994); American Composers Alliance
 Julia Adolphe (b. 1988)
     Unearth, Release, Concerto for viola and orchestra (2016)
 Milton Adolphus (1913–1988)
     Bouncettino for viola and piano, Op. 78 (1944); American Composers Alliance
     Improvisation for viola and piano, Op. 61 (1937); American Composers Alliance
 Ernani Aguiar (b. 1950)
     Meloritmias No. 5 for viola solo (1987); Editora Novas Metas
 Miguel del Águila (b. 1957)
     Concierto en Tango, Concerto for viola and orchestra (2014); Peermusic Classical
     Silence for viola and piano (2016)
     Submerged for flute, viola and harp (2015)
 Kalevi Aho (b. 1949)
     Am Horizont for viola solo with voice (2020); Fennica Gehrman
     Concerto for viola and chamber orchestra (2006); Fennica Gehrman
     Lamento for 2 violas (2001); Modus Musiikki
     Solo XII (In Memoriam Einojuhani Rautavaara) for viola solo (2016); Fennica Gehrman
     Trio for clarinet, viola and piano (2006); Fennica Gehrman
 Joseph Ahrens (1904–1997)
     Sonata for viola and organ (or positive organ) (1953); Willy Müller Süddeutscher Musikverlag
 Necil Kazım Akses (1908–1999)
     Acıklı Ezgi (Canto Lamentoso): Hüzünlü Melodi (Sad Melody) for viola solo (1984)
     Capriccio for viola solo (1977–1978); Devlet Konservatuvarı Yayınları
     Concerto for viola and orchestra (1977); Devlet Konservatuvarı Yayınları
 Isaac Albéniz (1860–1909)
     L'Automne from Les Saisons for viola and piano; original for piano; transcription by Paul-Louis Neuberth (1922); Éditions Costallat; Éditions Alphonse Leduc
     Mallorca: Barcarola for viola and piano, Op. 202 (1892); original for piano; transcription by J. Amaz; Unión Musical Ediciones
     Puerta de tierra: Bolero from Recuerdos de Viaje for viola and piano, Op. 71 (1887); original for piano; transcription by J. Amaz; Unión Musical Ediciones
     Tango in D major from España for viola and piano, Op. 165 No. 2 (1890); original for piano; transcription by Watson Forbes (1962); Oxford University Press
 Karel Albert (1901–1987)
     Werkstuk for viola and wind quintet or piano (1958); CeBeDeM
 Per Hjort Albertsen (1919–2015)
     Pastorale for viola and piano (1955); original from Liten Suite for Strykeorkester (Little Suite) for string orchestra, Op. 14 (1955); Music Information Centre Norway
     Sonatina for violin (or viola, or cello) and piano, Op. 50 (1985); Music Information Centre Norway
 Alexander Albrecht (1885–1958)
     Čertík v rozprávke (The Villain of the Fairytale) for viola solo (1952)
     Scherzo for violin and viola (1957)
     Suite Concertante for viola and piano (1948); Slovenský hudobný fond
     Trio for 2 violins and viola (1943); Opus Bratislava
 Johann Georg Albrechtsberger (1736–1809)
     Duo in C major for viola and cello (1783)
 Mark Alburger (b. 1957)
     Concerto "Felicitations" for viola and orchestra, Op. 119 (2004)
     Duo Sonata No. 2 "Wasatch" for viola and percussion, Op. 31 (1986)
 Luna Alcalay (1928–2012)
     Gyroskop for viola solo (1998); Edition HH; Music Information Centre Austria
     un sogno à tre for flute, viola and harp (1990); Music Information Centre Austria
 Liana Alexandra (1947–2011)
     Concerto for viola, flute and chamber orchestra, Op. 23 (1980); Editura Muzicală
     Quasi Cadenza for violin or viola solo, Op. 27 (1983)
 Román Alís (1931–2006)
     Balada de las cuatro cuerdas: pequeña pieza (Ballad on Four Strings: Little Piece) for viola and piano, Op.  116 (1977); Ópera Tres
     Cuatro piezas (4 Pieces) for 2 violas, Op. 98 (1972)
     Estudio (Study) for viola and piano, Op. 57 (1966)
 Charles-Valentin Alkan (1813–1888)
     Sonate de Concert in E major for viola and piano, Op. 47 (1857); transcription by Casimir Ney (published 1858); original for cello and piano
 Claude Loyola Allgén (1920–1990) <ref name
     Dialog (Dialogue) for violin and viola (1986); Swedish Music Information Centre
     Drakdans av Béla Bartók for viola and piano (1955); Swedish Music Information Centre
 António Victorino d'Almeida (b. 1940)
     Sonata for viola and piano, Op. 94 (1994); AvA Musical Editions
     Rock and Roll for viola, double bass and piano, Op. 112 (1998)
 José Antônio de Almeida Prado (1943–2010)
     Sertões (Backcountry) for viola solo (1978); Tonos Musikverlag
     Sonata No. 1 for viola and piano (1983); Tonos Musikverlag
 Eduardo Alonso-Crespo (b. 1956)
     Concerto for viola and string orchestra, Op. 17 (2002)
     Double Concerto for violin, viola and string orchestra, Op. 41 (2022)
 Ruben Altunyan (1939–2021)
     Concerto-Symphony (Կոնցերտ-Սիմֆոնիա; Концерт-Симфония) for violin, viola and orchestra (1966)
 William Alwyn (1905–1985)
     Ballade for viola and piano (1939); Corda Music Publications
     2 Folk Tunes for cello or viola and piano (or harp) (1936); Oxford University Press
     Pastoral Fantasia for viola and string orchestra (1939); Corda Music Publications
     Sonata Impromptu for violin and viola (1939); Corda Music Publications
     Sonatina for viola and piano (1941, 1944); The William Alwyn Foundation
 Efraín Amaya (b. 1959)
     Recuerdos (Memories) for viola solo (1982); Lafi Publishers
 Johan Amberg (1946–1914)
     Fantaisiestücke (Fantasy Pieces) for clarinet, viola and piano, Op. 12 (1910); Wilhelm Hansen Musikforlag
 Claudio Ambrosini (b. 1948)
      'Oh, mia Euridice'...a Fragment for clarinet and viola (1981)
 André Amellér (1912–1990)
     L'arc-en-ciel (The Rainbow), 7 Easy Pieces for viola and piano, Op. 221 (1975); Éditions Gérard Billaudot
     Hétérodoxes for solo string quartet and orchestra, Op. 181 (1970); Éditions Musicales Transatlantiques
     Mon premier concert (My First Concert), 6 Easy Pieces for viola and piano, Op. 218 (1975); Éditions Combre
     Petit nuage (Little Cloud) for viola and piano, Op. 308 (1983); Éditions Alphonse Leduc
     Sarabande for viola solo, Op. 80 (1953)
     Sonatina for viola or violin, Op. 357 (1984)
     Sourire (Smile) for viola and piano, Op. 307 (1983); Éditions Alphonse Leduc
     Speranza for viola or violin and piano, Op. 375 (1986); Éditions Alphonse Leduc
     Trois pièces faciles (3 Easy Pieces) for viola and piano, Op. 208 (1973); Éditions Combre
 Fikret Amirov (1922–1984)
     Elegy for cello (or viola) and piano (1948);  (State Music Publishing House)
 Martin Amlin (b. 1953)
     Encomium for viola and harp (2004); Theodore Presser
     Kennel for viola and piano (2011); Theodore Presser
     Sonata for viola and piano (1987); Theodore Presser
     Violetta for viola and piano (2010); Theodore Presser
 Johann Andreas Amon (1763–1825).
     3 Concertante Quartets for solo viola and string trio, Op. 15
     Concerto No. 1 in A major for viola and orchestra, Op. 10 (1799)
     Concerto No. 2 in E major for viola and orchestra
     6 Duos for violin and viola, Op. 2 (1791)
     Quartet for solo viola and string trio, Op. 18 No. 3 (1803)
     Quintet for flute, viola and string trio, Op. 19 No. 3
 David Amram (b. 1930)
     The Wind and the Rain for viola and piano (1964); based on movement II of Shakespearean Concerto; C. F. Peters
 Pierre Ancelin (1934–2001)
     Lyriques, 3 Pieces for viola and piano (1984); Éditions Gérard Billaudot
 Carl-Olof Anderberg (1914–1972)
     Concerto for viola and orchestra (1945); STIM; Swedish Music Information Centre
 Karl August Andersen (1903–1970)
     En Spillemannstubb (Fiddler's Catch) for violin and viola (1955); Norsk Musikforlag
 Beth Anderson (b. 1950)
     April Swale for viola and harpsichord (2000)
     Little Trio for flute, viola and guitar (1983); American Composers Alliance
     May Swale for viola solo (1997)
     Nightsong for soprano, viola and piano (2005)
 Julian Anderson (b. 1967)
     Prayer for viola solo (2009); Faber Music
 T. J. Anderson (b. 1928)
     Variations on a Theme by Alban Berg for viola and piano (1977); American Composers Alliance
     Vocalise for violin (or viola) and harp (1980); American Composers Alliance
 B. Tommy Andersson (b. 1964)
     Allegro marcato in C minor for viola and double bass (1980)
     Concertino for 8 violas (1982)
     Concerto for viola and small orchestra (1983)
     Divertimento for viola, trombone and cello (1983); Swedish Music Information Centre
     Du som är...  for women's chorus, solo viola and organ (1986); words by Dag Hammarsköld; Swedish Music Information Centre
     Fantasia per viola sola (1979, 1987); based on Soloviolinfantasi for violin solo; Swedish Music Information Centre
     Insieme for viola and percussion (1982)
     Insieme II for flute and viola (1982)
     Musik till Molières Don Juan (Incidental Music to Molière's Don Juan) for flute and viola (1983); Swedish Music Information Centre
     Variationer över ett tema av Mozart (Variations on a Theme of Mozart) for 2 violas (1984); Swedish Music Information Centre
 Samuel Andreyev (b. 1981)
     Bern Trio for oboe d'amore, viola and harp (2015)
     Midnight Audition for viola solo (2013)
     Moving for piccolo oboe (musette), viola and piano (2005–2006, revised 2015)
 Iosif Andriasov – Иосиф Аршакович Андриасов (1933–2000)
     Meditation (Musical Sketch) in D major for viola and string orchestra, Op. 30e (1981); IMMA Publishing
     Musical Sketch in F major for viola and string orchestra, Op. 4a (1985, revised 1996); IMMA Publishing
 Hendrik Andriessen (1892–1981)
     Sonata in F minor for viola and piano (1967); Donemus
     Sonatine in één deel (Sonatina in One Movement) in E minor for viola and piano (1924); Broekmans & Van Poppel
 Jurriaan Andriessen (1925–1996)
     Movimenti III for violin, viola, cello with wind instruments and percussion (1974); Donemus
 Louis Andriessen (1939–2021)
     Tuin van Zink (Garden of Zinc) for viola and live electronics (1998)
 Paul Angerer (1927–2017)
     Concerto for viola and brass sextet (3 trumpets, 2 trombones, tuba) (1950); Music Information Centre Austria
     Concerto for viola and orchestra (1962, 1975); Verlag Doblinger
     Concerto for viola, harpsichord and 5 winds (oboe, English horn, 2 bassoons, trumpet) (1946); Universal Edition
     Concerto for viola, strings and brass (1947); Music Information Centre Austria
     Duo for alto recorder and viola (1952); Music Information Centre Austria
     Duo for viola and cello (1949); Verlag Doblinger
     Duo for violin and viola (1951); Music Information Centre Austria
     Exercitium Canonicum, 4 Canonic Pieces for 2 violas (1980); Verlag Doblinger
     Musica ad impulsum et pulsum for violin, viola, cello and double bass soli, string orchestra and percussion (1955); Verlag Doblinger
     Musik für Streichinstrumente VII, Trio for 2 violas and double bass (1950); Verlag Doblinger
     Musik für Streichinstrumente IX for viola and string orchestra (1950); Music Information Centre Austria
     Musik für Viola allein for viola solo (1948); Verlag Doblinger
     Musik für Viola und Klavier for viola and piano (1945); Music Information Centre Austria
     Musique pour alto et contrebasse for viola and double bass (1949); Music Information Centre Austria
     Partita in E minor for viola and piano (1944); Music Information Centre Austria
     Ruminatio for viola and piano (1953); Music Information Centre Austria
 Anna Amalia, Princess of Prussia (1723–1787)
     Duet for violin and viola (c.1767); Ars Femina
     Fugue for violin and viola (1776); Walter Wollenweber Verlag
 Anonymous
     44 18th-Century Italian Viola Duets for 2 violas; Gems Music Publications
 Peter van Anrooy (1879–1954)
     Romance in E minor for viola and piano (1900)
 Theodore Antoniou (1935–2018)
     For Viola and Piano for viola and piano (1993); GunMar Music
     Trio for flute, viola and cello, Op. 14 (1964); Edition Modern
 Jorge Antunes (b. 1942)
     Mascaruncho for 2 violas (1977); Musicália, São Paulo
     Microformóbiles I for viola and piano (1970); Edizioni Suvini Zerboni
     Modinha para Mindinha (Tune for Mindinha) for 7 violas (1985); written for Arminda, wife of Heitor Villa-Lobos; Sistrum, Brasilia
 Georges Aperghis (b. 1945)
     Crosswind for viola and saxophone quartet (1997); Éditions Durand
     En un tournemain for viola solo (1987); Éditions Durand
     Rasch for violin and viola (2001)
     Volte-face for viola solo (1997); Éditions Durand
 Denis ApIvor (1916–2004)
     Cinquefoil for flute, guitar and viola, Op. 79 (1984); British Music Information Centre
     Sonatina for viola and piano, Op. 90 (1992); British Music Information Centre
     String Abstract for violin, viola and cello soli with string orchestra, Op. 43 (1967); British Music Information Centre
 Edward Applebaum (1937–2020)
     Concerto for viola and chamber orchestra (1967)
     Foci for viola and piano (1973); J. & W. Chester; Edition Wilhelm Hansen
 Louis Applebaum (1918–2000)
     Notions for violin or viola and piano (1990); Canadian Music Centre
 Atar Arad (b. 1945)
     6 Caprices for viola solo (2003)
     12 Caprices for viola solo (2014); Friedrich Hofmeister Musikverlag
     Concerto per la Viola for viola and small orchestra (2005)
     Esther for violin and viola
     Rondo for viola and cello
     Sonata for viola solo (1992); Israel Music Institute
     Tikvah for viola solo (2007)
 Chaya Arbel (1921–2007)
     Intermezzo for viola and piano (1995); Israeli Music Center
     Sonata for viola and piano (2002)
 Violet Archer (1913–2000) 
     Six Miniatures for viola and piano (1984); Canadian Music Centre
     Sonata for viola, cello and piano (1986); Canadian Music Centre
 José Ardévol (1911–1981)
     Sonata a tres, Sonata No. 2 for 2 flutes and viola (1943); Southern Music Publishing
     Sonatina for viola and piano (1932)
 Bülent Arel (1919–1990)
     Parça (Piece) for viola solo (1971); American Composers Alliance
     Viyola için Müzik (Music for Viola; Musik für Viola) (1957); Impero-Verlag
     Sonatina for viola and piano (1945)
 Nils-Göran Areskoug (b. 1951)
     Itération – isometrique – rhythmique: Improvisation for viola and piano (1975); Swedish Music Information Centre
 Nick Ariondo
     Fantasia for viola solo (2011)
     Kalamatiano for viola and free-bass accordion (1986); Ricordi
 Attilio Ariosti (1666–1729)
     Sonata No. 2 for viola d'amore or viola and piano (1715); original for viola da gamba and basso continuo; transcription by Louis van Waefelghem (1896)
 Rodolfo Arízaga (1926–1985)
     Cantatas humanas for alto and viola, Op. 9
     Ciaccona for viola solo (1969); Editorial Argentina de Música
 Marian Arkwright (1863–1922)
     2 Concert Pieces for viola and piano (published 1908)
     Rêveries for oboe, viola and piano
     Trio for oboe, viola and piano
 Paul Arma (1905–1987)
     Divertimento No. 6 for clarinet or viola and piano (1955); Henry Lemoine
     Divertimento de concert No. 6 for clarinet or viola and string orchestra with xylophone (1955); Henry Lemoine
     2 Improvisations for viola solo; Éditions Choudens
     Sonata for viola solo; Éditions Choudens
     3 Transparences for flute, oboe or violin and clarinet or viola (1961); Henry Lemoine
 Elinor Armer (b. 1939)
     Taking the Waters on Oling Island for viola solo; The American Viola, J.B. Elkus & Son; MMB Music
 Craig Armstrong (b. 1959)
     Seven Stations for viola, percussion and tape (1988); Scottish Music Centre
 Richard Arnest (b. 1950)
     Epithalamion for viola solo (2004)
     Sonata for viola and piano (2003)
 Richard Arnell (1917–2009)
     Partita for unaccompanied viola, Op. 30 (1961); Hinrichsen Edition
     Sinfonia Concertante for violin, viola and orchestra (1938)
 Blaž Arnič (1901–1970)
     Concerto for viola and orchestra, Op. 75 (1967); Društvo Slovenskih Skladateljev
 Malcolm Arnold (1921–2006)
     Concerto for viola and chamber orchestra, Op. 108 (1971); Faber Music; G. Schirmer Inc.
     Duo for flute and viola, Op. 10 (1945); Faber Music; G. Schirmer Inc.
     Trio for flute, viola and bassoon, Op. 6 (1942); Novello; Paterson's Publications
     Sonata for viola and piano, Op. 17 (1947); Alfred Lengnick & Co.
 Ángel Arteaga (1928–1984)
     Cuatro improvisaciónes (4 Improvisations) for viola and piano (1960); Editorial Alpuerto
 Eduard Artemyev (1937–2022)
     Concerto in One Movement (Концерт (I часть) для альта с оркестром) for viola and orchestra (1960)
 Alexander Arutiunian (1920–2012)
     "Retro" Sonata for viola and piano (1983); Zen-On Music Co.
 Boris Asafyev (1884–1949)
     Sonata for viola solo (1938);  (State Music Publishing House)
     Variations on a Theme of Tchaikovsky (Вариации на тему Чайковского) for viola and piano
 Robert Ashley (1930–2014)
     How Can I Tell the Difference? for violin or viola with electronics and tape (1974)
 Algernon Ashton (1859–1937)
     Sonata in A minor for viola and piano, Op. 44 (1888); N. Simrock
 Daniel Asia (b. 1953)
     Orange for viola solo (1979); Merion Music
 Peter Askim (b. 1971)
     Concerto for viola and orchestra (2011)
     Inner Voices for viola solo (2011)
     Viola and Double Bass for viola and double bass (2009)
 Sergei Aslamazyan (1897–1978)
     Melodie for viola and piano;  (State Music Publishing House)
 Clarice Assad (b. 1978)
     Metamorfose (Metamorphosis) for viola and piano (2017)
 Kurt Atterberg (1887–1974)
     Sonata in B minor for cello (or violin, or viola, or horn) and piano, Op. 27 (1925); Musikaliska konstföreningen; AB Nordiska Musikförlaget
     Suite No. 3 for violin, viola and string orchestra, Op. 19 No. 1 (1917); Eriks Musikhandel och Förlag
 Tony Aubin (1907–1981)
     Passacaglia dell'addio for viola and piano (1977); Éditions Alphonse Leduc
 Lera Auerbach (b. 1973)
     Dialogues on Stabat Mater after Pergolesi for violin, viola, vibraphone and string orchestra (continuo ad libitum) (2005); Hans Sikorski
     Monologue for viola solo, Op. 38 (1997); Hans Sikorski
 Dorothea Austin (1921–2011)
     Analogy for viola, cello and piano (1985)
     Transformation for viola, piano and tape (1973)
 Elizabeth R. Austin (b. 1938)
     B-A-C-Homage for viola and piano (2007); American Composers Alliance
 Larry Austin (1930–2018)
     Catalogo Sonoro "Narciso" for viola and tape (1978); American Composers Alliance
     Quadrants: Event/Complex 8 for viola and 4-channel tape (1973); American Composers Alliance
 Menachem Avidom (1908–1995)
     Sonata for unaccompanied viola (1984); Israel Music Institute
 Tzvi Avni (b. 1927)
     Phoenix (כעוף החול) for viola solo (2001); Israel Music Institute
 Gad Avrahami (b. 1952)
     Dialogue for viola and piano (1998); Israeli Music Center
 Ana-Maria Avram (1961–2017)
     Ananda Asur Ely II for clarinet and viola (2000)
     Hyle II for 2 violas, ensemble and computer assisted sounds (2008)
     Ikarus VI for viola and tape (1997)
     Incantaţie (Incantatio) for viola and orchestra (2003)
     Quinconce I for viola and computer assisted sounds (2002)
     Quinconce II for viola and computer assisted sounds (2005)
     Seven Romanian Folk Songs from Béla Bartók's Collections for viola and piano (2003), or viola and orchestra (2004)
     Ten Romanian Folk Songs from Béla Bartók's Collections for viola, piano and string quartet (2010)
 David Avshalomov (b. 1946)
     Torn Curtain, Suite for viola and piano (1991); Raven Music
 Jacob Avshalomov (1919–2013)
     Arias for viola and chamber orchestra (2006); Howlett Press-Music
     Evocations for clarinet or viola and piano (1994); Howlet Press-Music
     The Most Triumphant Bird for mixed chorus, viola concertante and piano (1987); Howlet Press-Music
     Poem-Fantasies for violin and viola (1994); Howlet Press-Music
     Sonatina for viola and piano (1947); Howlet Press-Music

B

Ba
 Vahram Babayan (born 1948)
     Sonata for viola and piano, Op. 88 (1985)
     Sonata for viola solo, Op. 127 (2000)
 Milton Babbitt (1916–2011)
     Composition for viola and piano (1950); Associated Music Publishers Inc.
     Mehr “Du” for soprano, viola and piano (1991); C. F. Peters
     Play It Again, Sam for viola solo (1989); C. F. Peters
     Soli e Duettini for violin and viola (1990); C. F. Peters
     Triad for viola, clarinet and piano (1994); C. F. Peters
 Grażyna Bacewicz (1909–1969)
     Concerto for viola and orchestra (1968); Polskie Wydawnictwo Muzyczne
     Sonata for viola solo (1958); Polskie Wydawnictwo Muzyczne
 Carl Philipp Emanuel Bach (1714–1788)
     Solfeggietto; transcription for viola and piano by William Primrose; Carl Fischer
 Jan Bach (born 1937)
     Eisteddfod, Variations and Penillion on the Welsh folk tune "Ymadawiad y Brenin" for flute, viola and harp (1972); Highgate Press; Galaxy Music Corporation; ECS Publishing
     Lullaby for soprano, 3 violas and cello (1966); words by James Agee; Meadow Music
     The Viola from People of Note for tenor and viola (1993); words by Laurence McKinney
 Johann Christian Bach (1735–1782)
     Concerto in C minor for viola and string orchestra (published 1947); missattributed to J. C. Bach, but actually composed by Henri Casadesus
 Johann Christoph Friedrich Bach (1732–1795).
     Concerto in E major for piano, viola and orchestra, BR C44
 Johann Sebastian Bach (1685–1750)
     Brandenburg Concerto No. 6 in B major for 2 violas, 2 violas da gamba, cello, violone and continuo, BWV 1051 (1721)
     Fantasia Cromatica (Chromatic Fantasy) for solo viola, BWV 903; original for harpsichord; transcription by Zoltán Kodály; Boosey & Hawkes
 P. D. Q. Bach (1807–1742?); see also Peter Schickele
     Sonata for Viola Four Hands and Harpsichord, S. 440; Theodore Presser Co. 1971
 Wilhelm Friedemann Bach (1710–1784).
     3 Duos for 2 violas, F60-62
     Sonata in C minor for viola and harpsichord
 Alfred Bachelet (1864–1944)
     Barcarolle nocturne et Petite histoire, 2 Pièces inséparables for cello (or viola, or violin) and orchestra (1927); Éditions Durand; United Music Publishers
 Sven-Erik Bäck (1919–1994)
     Elegi for viola (or alto saxophone, or clarinet) and piano (1952); Edition Wilhelm Hansen
 Johann Georg Heinrich Backofen (1768–1830?)
     Concertante for harp, viola and continuo ad libitum, Op. 8
 Ernst Bacon (1898–1990)
     Koschatiana for cello or viola and piano (1945); after a song by Thomas Koschat; Delkas Music; Ernst Bacon Society
     Peterborough, N.H., Suite (2 versions) for viola and piano (1952); Ernst Bacon Society
     Sonata for viola and piano (1987); Ernst Bacon Society
 Nicolas Bacri (born 1961)
     Cantilènes, Trois Chants for violin or viola and orchestra, Op. 29b (1988–1989); Éditions Durand
     Chaconne, Duo No. 3 for violin and viola, Op. 30c (1990); Éditions Durand
     Concerto Tenebroso "L'hiver" for oboe (or violin), viola and string orchestra, Op. 80 No. 3 (2009); Le Chant du Monde
     Croisements, Duo No. 1 for violin and viola, Op. 9 (1983–1984); Éditions Durand
     Deux Duos for 2 violas, Op. 6; Éditions Durand
          Épisodes nocturnes (1982)
          Threnos, 2 pièces funèbres (1987–1994)
     Deux Lieder for viola and piano, Op. 3 (1981); Éditions Calao, Paris
     Deux Sonatines opposées for clarinet (or viola, or alto saxophone) and piano, Op. 108 (2008–2009); Éditions Alphonse Leduc
          Sonatina lirica
          Sonatina lapidaria
     Élégie for violin (or viola, or cello) and piano, Op. 75b (2002); Peer Music Classical
     Folia, Chaconne symphonique for viola or cello and string orchestra, Op. 30b (1990); Éditions Durand
     Lyric Interlude (A Study in Pastoral Style) for English horn (or flute, or clarinet, or viola) and piano, Op. 110b (2008)
     Notturno funèbre for viola and piano (1986); Collection Panorama: Œuvres Contemporaines, Volume 1 (1987); Éditions Gérard Billaudot
     Petite musique de nuit for alto saxophone (or clarinet, or viola) and piano, Op.  111 (2008); Éditions Gérard Billaudot
     Quasi Variazioni, Divertissement "In Memoriam Paul Hindemith" for cello or viola and piano, Op. 27 (1989); Éditions Durand
     Quatre Intermezzi, Duo No. 2 for violin and viola, Op. 16 (1984–1990); Éditions Durand
     Requiem "In Memoriam Dmitri Chostakovitch" for viola or cello and string orchestra with flute and harp, Op. 23 (1987–1988); Éditions Durand
     Sérénade No. 2: Cinq Improvisations d'après Fernand Verhesen for viola solo, alto flute, harp and vibraphone (or viola and piano), Op. 10 (1983); Éditions Durand
     Sonata Variata for viola solo, Op. 70 (2000–2001); Peermusic Classical
     Sonata da Camera for viola and piano, Op. 67 (1977, 1997–2000); Peermusic Classical
     Sonate-Méditation for violin-baritone (or violin, or viola, or cello) solo (2008); Éditions Durand
     Une Prière for viola and orchestra, Op. 52 (1994–1997); Éditions Durand
 Conrad Baden (1908–1989) 
     Concerto for viola and orchestra, Op. 99 (1973); Music Information Centre Norway
 Henk Badings (1907–1987)
     Cavatina for viola and piano (1952); Donemus
     Concerto for viola and string orchestra (1965); Donemus
     Concerto for violin, viola and orchestra (1965); Donemus
     Double Concerto for violin, viola and orchestra (1964); Donemus
     Quempas for viola and organ (1967); Donemus
     Sonata for viola and piano (1951); Donemus; C.F. Peters
     Sonata for violin and viola (1928); Donemus
     Trio III for 2 violins and viola (1945); Donemus
     Trio V for flute, violin and viola (1947); Donemus
     Trio IX for flute, viola and guitar (1962); Donemus
     Trio X for alto flute, viola and harp (1977); Donemus
 August Baeyens (1895–1966)
     Concerto for viola and orchestra, Op. 54 (1956); Editions Metropolis; CeBeDeM
 Simon Bainbridge (1952–2021)
     Birthday Fragment for 4 violas (2006); Novello & Co.
     Concerto for viola and orchestra (1976); United Music Publishers
     Mobile for viola, flute, 2 clarinets and harp (1991, 1994); original version for English horn and piano; Novello & Co.
 Edgar Bainton (1880–1956)
     Sonata for viola and piano (1922)
 Tadeusz Baird (1928–1981)
     Concerto Lugubre for viola and orchestra (1975); Polskie Wydawnictwo Muzyczne; H. Litolff's Verlag/C.F. Peters
 Vladimir Bakaleinikov (1885–1953)
     Aria for viola and piano (1935); Boosey & Hawkes
     Concerto for viola and orchestra (1937)
     Gavotte for viola and piano (1937); Belwin
     Minuetto for viola and piano (1937); Boosey & Hawkes
 Claude Baker (born 1948)
     Three Phantasy Pieces for viola and percussion (2003, revised 2005); Hal Leonard
 David Baker (1931–2016)
     Concert Piece for viola and orchestra (1989); MMB Music
 Michael Conway Baker (born 1937)
     Counterplay for viola and string orchestra, Op. 16 (1971); Evocation Publishing
     Counterplay for viola and piano, Op. 18 (1973); Evocation Publishing
     Duo Concertante for violin, viola and string orchestra, Op. 39 (1976); Evocation Publishing
     Duo Concertante for violin, viola and string orchestra, Op. 144 (2008); Evocation Publishing
     Passacaglia for violin, viola and piano, Op. 112 (1996); Evocation Publishing
     Point No Point for viola and string orchestra, Op. 33 (1975); Evocation Publishing
 Leonardo Balada (born 1933)
     Concerto for viola and wind ensemble (2009–2010); Beteca Music
 Osvaldas Balakauskas (born 1937)
     Corrente for flute, viola and piano (2005); Lithuanian Music Information and Publishing Centre
     Do nata for cello or viola and tape (1982); Polskie Wydawnictwo Muzyczne
     Duo concertante for viola and piano (2007)
     Medis ir paukštė (The Tree and the Bird) for viola and piano (1976); Lithuanian Music Information and Publishing Centre
     Trio concertante for flute, viola and piano (2008); Lithuanian Music Information and Publishing Centre
 Sándor Balassa (1935–2021)
     Dimenziók (Dimensions; Dimensioni) for flute and viola, Op. 8 (1966); Editio Musica Budapest
     Fűzérke (Little Garland) for flute, viola and harp, Op. 51 (1994)
     Hárfástrio (Harp Trio), Trio for violin, viola and harp, Op. 19 (1971); Editio Musica Budapest
     Üdvözlet Violának (Greetings to Viola) for viola solo, Op. 90 (2005)
  (1961–2019)
     Înainte de rostire, Poem without Words for soprano, alto saxophone and viola (2008)
     În faptul unei stări, Trio for oboe, viola and piano (2006)
     Odată cu trecerea timpului, Trio for alto saxophone, viola and piano (2005)
 Claude Ballif (1924–2004)
     Trio for flute, viola and harp, Op. 43 No. 1 (1969); Éditions Choudens
     Solfeggietto for viola solo, Op. 36 No. 19 (1999); Éditions Durand
 Alain Bancquart (1934–2022)
     Baroques for viola and orchestra (1973); Édition E.F.M.; United Music Publishers
     Concerto for viola and orchestra (1965); Éditions Jobert
     Duo for viola and harp (1985); Éditions Ricordi; United Music Publishers
     Écorces I for violin and viola (published 1968); Éditions Jobert
     Jeux pour lumière for violin, viola, cello and orchestra (1969); Éditions Jobert
     Les Tarots d'Ulysse for soprano, tenor and baritone soloists, violin, viola and flute soli, children's chorus, percussion, synthesizers and tape (1984); Éditions Ricordi
     Ma manière d'arbre II: Du lent sommeil des feuilles for viola and 10 instruments (1992); Éditions Ricordi; United Music Publishers
     Pièce canonique en trio for viola and piano; Collection Panorama: Œuvres Contemporaines, Volume 1 (1987); Éditions Gérard Billaudot
     Sonata for viola solo (1983); Éditions Ricordi
 Granville Bantock (1868–1946)
     Sonata in F major "Colleen" for viola and piano (1919); J. & W. Chester
     Sonata in B minor for viola and piano
 Seymour Barab (1921–2014)
     Concertino for viola and string orchestra (1993); Seesaw Music
     Concerto for viola and orchestra (1995); Seesaw Music
     Duo for viola and cello (1993); Seesaw Music
     Duo for viola and harp (2000); Seesaw Music
     Duo for viola and orchestra; Seesaw Music
     Duo [I] for viola and piano (1994); Seesaw Music
     Duo II for viola and piano (1994); Seesaw Music
     Duo III for viola and piano (1994); Seesaw Music
     Duo for violin and viola (1994); Seesaw Music
     Duo Concertante for 2 violas and woodwinds; Seesaw Music
     Suite for clarinet, viola and piano (1994); Seesaw Music
     Suite for viola, horn and piano (1994); Seesaw Music
     Suite for flute, viola and piano (2000); Seesaw Music
     Suite for viola and cello (1993); Seesaw Music
     Trio for flute, viola and harp (1993); Seesaw Music
 İlhan Baran (born 1934)
     Bir Bölümlü Sonatina (Sonatina in One Movement) for viola and piano (1965)
 George Barati (1913–1996)
     Cantabile e Ritmico for viola and piano (1947); Peermusic
     Duo I for flute and viola (1976); American Composers Alliance
     Duo II for flute and viola (1977); American Composers Alliance
     Spring Serenade for flute, viola and cello (1987); American Composers Alliance
     Trio for flute, viola and guitar (1979?); American Composers Alliance
     Trio Profundo for viola, cello and double bass (1990); American Composers Alliance
 Josef Bardanashvili – ברדנשווילי יוסף (born 1948)
     Metamorphoses (מטמורפוזות) for viola and piano (1998); Israeli Music Center
     Postludium (פוסטלודיום), Concerto for viola and chamber orchestra (2002); Israel Music Institute
 Vytautas Barkauskas (1931–2020)
     Concerto for viola and chamber orchestra (1981); Sovetsky kompozitor; Schirmer Russian Music; Lithuanian Music Information and Publishing Centre
     Duo Concertante for violin, viola and orchestra, Op. 122 (2004); Lithuanian Music Information and Publishing Centre
     Duo Sonata for violin and viola (1984)
     Eskizas (Sketch) for viola and piano (published 1988); Lithuanian Music Information and Publishing Centre
     Toccamento No. 2 for viola solo, violin, cello and piano (1998); Lithuanian Music Information and Publishing Centre
     Du monologai (Two Monologues) for viola solo, Op. 71 (1983, 2004); Lithuanian Music Information and Publishing Centre
 Michael Barkl (born 1958)
     Coming Out, Fanfare for viola and double bass (1998); Australian Music Centre
     Night Words for viola and piano (1977); Australian Music Centre
 Wayne Barlow (1912–1996)
     Elegy for viola and piano (1967); L. Schwann
     Intermezzo for viola and harp (1980)
 Milton Barnes (1931–2001)
     Ballade for solo viola (1978); Canadian Music Centre
     Canciones español for soprano, viola and piano (1997); Canadian Music Centre
     Concerto for viola and orchestra (1977); Canadian Music Centre
     Elizabethan Dances for viola and piano (1979); Canadian Music Centre
     Harbord Street for flute, viola and harp (1991); Canadian Music Centre
     Lament; Hymn Tune Pavane for viola and piano (1976); Canadian Music Centre
     Lamentations of Jeremiah for viola solo (1959); Jaymar Music; Canadian Music Centre
     Three Elizabethan Dances, Incidental Music for Romeo and Juliet for viola, guitar and percussion (1976); Canadian Music Centre
     Vignette for Juliet, Incidental Music for Romeo and Juliet, Improvisation for viola, guitar and percussion (1976); Canadian Music Centre
 David Barnett (1907–1985)
     Ballade for viola and piano, Op. 16 (1959); Oxford University Press
 Matthew Barnson (born 1979)
     Nocturnes for viola, Hammond B3 organ and percussion (2002)
     3 Pieces for viola solo (1997–1998)
     Rounds for soprano and 2 violas (2006)
     Seraph, Duo for violin and viola (2005)
     4 Songs for voice and piano or viola (2004)
     Tyger, Tyger for clarinet, viola and piano (2010)
 Bernard Barrell (1919–2005)
     A Pageant of Pieces for viola and piano, Op. 100 (1982); Stainer & Bell
     Partita for violin or viola solo, Op. 81 (1976); Barry Brunton Music Publishers
     4 Party Pieces for viola and piano, Op. 114 (1987); Piper Publications
     Soliloquy for cello (or violin, or viola, or clarinet) and piano, Op. 3 (1939)
 Joyce Howard Barrell (1917–1989)
     Three Fours for viola and piano, Op. 45 (1986); Barry Brunton Music Publisher
 Richard Barrett (born 1959)
     ecliptic for viola solo (2003); United Music Publishers
     Nothing Elsewhere for viola solo (1987, revised 2005); United Music Publishers
 Odoardo Barri (1844–1920)
     6 Morceaux de salon for violin or viola and piano (1890)
 Sergio Barroso (born 1946)
     Concerto for viola and orchestra (1996); Canadian Music Centre
     Sandunga for viola and tape (1998); Canadian Music Centre
     Viola desnuda for viola solo (1995–1997); Canadian Music Centre
     Viejas voces for viola and tape (1993–1994); Canadian Music Centre
 Gerald Barry (born 1952)
     Concerto for viola and orchestra (2018–2019); Schott Music
 Jiří Bárta (1935–2012)
     Concerto for viola, chamber string orchestra and piano (2001); Český Hudební Fond
 Lubor Bárta (1928–1972)
     Concerto for viola and orchestra (1957); Český Hudební Fond
 Hans-Christian Bartel (1932–2014)
     Concerto for viola and small orchestra (1963); Breitkopf und Härtel
 Pierre Bartholomée (born 1937)
     Aria andante for viola, harp and piano (2010); Quindicesima Publishing
     Et j'ai vu l'âme sur un fil...elle dansait for flute, viola and harp (2000); Quindicesima Publishing
     Face à face for viola solo (2009); Quindicesima Publishing
     Sonata for viola and piano (2003–2004); Quindicesima Publishing
     Trois Pôles entrelacés for viola and harp soloists, English horn, bass clarinet, contrabassoon and 2 horns (1985); Éditions Salabert
 Béla Bartók (1881–1945)
     Bagatelle for viola and piano, Op. 6 No. 2, Sz. 38 (1908); original for piano; transcription by Vadim Borisovsky
     44 Duets for 2 violas, Sz. 98, BB104 (1931–1932); original for 2 violins; adaptation by William Primrose; Boosey & Hawkes
     An Evening in the Village (Este a székelyekél) and Slovak Peasant's Dance (Tót legények tánca) for viola and piano (1924); transcription by Károly Váczi; Editio Musica Budapest
     Concerto for viola and orchestra, Sz. 120, BB128 (1945); completed in 1949 by Tibor Serly
 Bruno Bartolozzi (1911–1980)
     Andamenti for viola solo (1967); Edizioni Suvini Zerboni
     Musica per Piero for 2 violas (1971); Edizioni Suvini Zerboni
 Jan Zdeněk Bartoš (1908–1981)
     Concerto da camera for viola and string orchestra (1970); Bärenreiter-Verlag; Český Hudební Fond
     Fantazie for viola solo (1980); Panton Praha; Český Hudební Fond
     Koncert pro trio for violin, viola, cello and string orchestra (1975); Český Hudební Fond
     Partita for viola solo, Op. 36 (1944); Pritomnosti; Český Hudební Fond
     Sonatina for viola and piano, Op. 46 (1947); Orbis; Artia; Český Hudební Fond
     Staří přátele (Old Friends), Concertante Suite for viola, double bass and 9 wind instruments (1964); Český Hudební Fond
     Trio for violin, viola and harp (1961); Český Hudební Fond
 Carin Bartosch Edström (born 1965)
     Happiness Is a G-String for viola solo (1996); Swedish Music Information Centre
 Leslie Bassett (1923–2016)
     Sonata for viola and piano (1956); American Composers Alliance
     Trio for clarinet, viola and piano (1953); American Composers Alliance
 Stanley Bate (1911–1959)
     Concerto for viola and orchestra, Op. 46 (1944–1946); Edition Schott
     Pastorale for viola and piano, Op. 57 (1947)
 Dennis Báthory-Kitsz (born 1949)
     Binky Plays Marbles: A Bruckner Boulevand Dance for viola and double bass (1992); Frog Peak Music
     Evasively Transcendental for viola solo (2007)
     In het Donkere Bos (In the Dark Forest) for viola and bass clarinet (2007)
     In Search of the Lightness of Horizon for viola solo (2007)
     In Search of the Seven Blue Stars for viola solo (2007)
 Marion Bauer (1882–1955)
     Sonata for viola and piano, Op. 22 (1932); Society for the Publication of American Music; G. Schirmer; Da Capo Press; Theodore Presser
 Ross Bauer (born 1951)
     Chin Music for viola and piano (1989); C. F. Peters
     Pulse for clarinet, viola and piano (1999); C. F. Peters
 Jürg Baur (1918–2010)
     Concerto for viola and orchestra (1951); Breitkopf & Härtel
     Polyphone Miniaturen for 4 violas (1998); Edition Dohr
     Sonata for viola solo (1969); Breitkopf & Härtel
 Arnold Bax (1883–1953)
     Concert Piece in C minor for viola and piano, GP 59 (1904); Corda Music Publications
     Elegiac Trio for flute, viola and harp, GP 178 (1916); Chester Music
     Fantasy Sonata in F minor for viola and harp, GP 284 (1927); Chappell & Co.
     Legend in E minor for viola and piano, GP 299 (1929); Chappell & Co.
     Phantasy for viola and orchestra, GP 235 (1920); Murdoch, Murdoch
     Sonata in G major for viola and piano, GP 251 (1921–1922); Chappell & Co.
     Trio in One Movement in E major for violin, viola (or clarinet) and piano, Op. 4, GP 87 (1906); Charles Avison; Chester Music; Lauren Publications
 Christabel Baxendale (1886–?)
     Plaintive Melody for violin or viola and piano (1951); Bosworth & Co.
 Paul Bazelaire (1886–1958)
     Funérailles for viola and piano, Op. 120 (1946); Éditions Salabert
     Morceau de Lecture for viola and piano; Médiathèque de Sedan
 Irwin Bazelon (1922–1995)
     Concatenations for percussion quartet and viola (1976); Theodore Presser
     Duo for viola and piano (1963, 1969–1970); Novello; Theodore Presser
     Fairy Tale for solo viola and chamber ensemble (1989); Theodore Presser

Be
 Amy Beach (1867–1944)
     Sonata for viola and piano, Op. 34 (1896); original for violin and piano; transcription by Roger Hannay (1978); Edition Peters
 Sally Beamish (born 1956)
     Ariel for viola solo (2012)
     Between Earth and Sea for flute, viola and harp (1997); Norsk Musikforlag
     Bratchwork for 4 violas (2006)
     Buzz for soprano and viola (1993)
     Concerto No. 1 for viola and orchestra (1995, 1998)
     Concerto No. 2 "The Seafarer" for viola and orchestra (2001); Norsk Musikforlag
     Concerto No. 3 "Under the Wing of the Rock" for viola and string orchestra (2006)
     Duet for Martin for viola and cello (1992)
     Halbkreis for viola and piano (1982)
     Little Variations for viola and piano (1986)
     Pennillion for viola solo (1998)
     Rhapsody on Themes from Hafez for harp, viola and string orchestra (2008)
     Sonata for viola and piano (2001)
     Sule Skerrie for viola and piano (1995)
     That Recent Earth for viola solo (2003)
 Janet Beat (born 1937)
     Circe for viola solo (1974); Bastet Productions; Furore Verlag
     Equinox Rituals: Autumn for viola and piano (1996); Furore Verlag
     Gedenkstück für Kaethe for clarinet and viola (2003); Furore Verlag
     Piano Quintet: The Dream Magus for viola with 2 violins, cello and piano (2002); Furore Verlag
 Betty Beath (born 1932)
     From a Quiet Place, 3 Pieces for viola and piano (1997); Keys Press; Wirripang; Australian Music Centre
 William Beauvais (born 1956)
     Storm Dancer for soprano, viola and guitar (2003); Les Productions d'OZ
 Gustavo Becerra-Schmidt (1925–2010)
     Concerto for viola and orchestra (2003)
     Partita for viola solo (1961)
     Rapsodia for viola solo (1985)
     Sonata for viola and piano (1950)
 Conrad Beck (1901–1989)
     Concerto for viola and orchestra (1949); Edition Schott
     Duo for violin and viola (1934–1935); Edition Schott
     Sonatina for viola and piano (1976–1977); Edition Schott
 Jeremy Beck (born 1960)
     Adagio and Allegro for violin and 2 violas (1981–1982, 2001–2002)
     Elegy for flute, viola and piano (1983)
     Fantasy for viola and piano (1997, 1999)
     Passages for viola solo (2013)
     Third Delphic Hymn for viola solo (1980)
 John J. Becker (1886–1961)
     Concerto for viola and orchestra (1937)
 John Beckwith (born 1927)
     Peregrine for solo viola, solo percussion and chamber orchestra (1989); Canadian Music Centre
 David Bedford (1937–2011)
     Jack of Shadows for viola and chamber ensemble (1973); Universal Edition
     Spillihpnerak for viola solo (1972); Universal Edition
 Luke Bedford (born 1978)
     Wonderful Two-Headed Nightingale for violin, viola and 15 players (2011); Universal Edition
 Norma Beecroft (born 1934)
     Jeu II for flute, viola, tape and live electronics (1985); Canadian Music Centre
     Troissonts for solo viola and 2 percussionists (1982); Canadian Music Centre
 Jack Beeson (1921–2010)
     Sonata for viola and piano (1953); Theodore Presser
 Ludwig van Beethoven (1770–1827)
     Duo "Mit zwei obligaten Augengläsern" ("With Eyeglasses Obligato") in E major for viola and cello, WoO32 (1796)
     Grand Duo in E major for viola and piano (1796); transcription of the Septet, Op. 20, by Friedrich Hermann (1853)
     Notturno in D major for viola and piano, Op. 42 (1803) after Serenade, String Trio No. 2 in D major, Op. 8 (1797)
     Serenade in D major for flute, violin and viola, Op. 25 (1795–1796?)
 Karol Beffa (born 1973)
     "Cortège des ombres", for clarinette, viola or cello and piano (2013) ; Éditions Gérard Billaudot
     En Miroir for saxophone, viola and piano (2012)
     Concerto for viola and string orchestra (2011)
     De profundis, sur le psaume 130 du livre des psaumes for viola and mixed chorus (2011); Éditions Gérard Billaudot
     Les ombres qui passent, Trio for violin, viola or cello and piano (2010); Éditions Gérard Billaudot
     Café 2010, Quartet for violin, viola, cello and piano (2010); Éditions Gérard Billaudot
     Manhattan for viola and piano (2009); Éditions Gérard Billaudot
     Mes heures de fièvre for mezzo-soprano, viola and piano (2011); Éditions Gérard Billaudot
     Paysages d'ombres for flute, viola and harp (2008); Éditions Gérard Billaudot
     5 Pièces for violin or viola and piano (2008); Éditions Gérard Billaudot; United Music Publishers
 Jeanne Behrend (1911–1988)
     Lamentation for viola and piano (1944); American Viola Society Publications
 Siegfried Behrend (1933–1990)
     Scherzoso for viola and guitar; Wilhelm Zimmermann Musikverlag
 Sadao Bekku (1922–2012)
     Concerto for viola and orchestra (1971); Zen-On Music Co.
 Louis-Noël Belaubre (1932–2017)
     Quatre Bagatelles (Four Bagatelles) for violin and viola, Op. 70
     Les Romances de Gai Savoir for flute, viola and harp, Op. 37
     Symphonie Concertante No. 4 for violin, viola and orchestra, Op. 58
     Variations sur un air anglais (Variations on an English Air) for viola and piano, Op. 63; Éditions Delatour
 Luca Belcastro (born 1964)
     Mari for viola or cello solo, Op. 29 (1999)
 Alan Belkin (born 1951)
     Sonata for viola and piano (2006); Canadian Music Centre
 William Henry Bell (1873–1946)
     Arab Love Song for viola and piano
     Cantilena for viola and piano
     Rosa Mystica, Concerto for viola and orchestra (1916)
     Sonata in D minor for clarinet (or viola) and piano (1926); Rosewood Publications
 Máté Bella (born 1985)
     Hesperus for viola and ensemble (2017); Editio Musica Budapest
 Viktor Bely (1904–1983)
     Poème (Поэма) for viola and piano (1921);  (State Music Publishing House); Universal Edition
 Ofer Ben-Amots (born 1955)
     Cantillations for clarinet and cello (or viola) (1997); Kallisti Music Press
 Jiří Antonín Benda (1722–1795).
     Concerto in F major for viola and orchestra (c.1775); sometimes erroneously attributed to Friedrich Wilhelm Heinrich Benda
 Paul Ben-Haim (1897–1984)
     Arabic Song (שיר אהבה ערבי; Arab Love Song) for viola and piano (1956); Israeli Music Publications
     Chamber Music (מוסיקה קאמרית) for flute, viola and harp (1978); Israeli Music Publications
     2 Landscapes (שתי תמונות נוף) for viola (or cello) and piano, Op. 27 (1939); Israeli Music Publications
     3 Songs without Words (שלושה שירים ללא מילים) for viola and piano (1952); original for cello and piano; Israeli Music Publications; Leeds Music
 Arthur Benjamin (1893–1960)
     Elegy, Waltz and Toccata, Sonata in E minor for viola and piano (1942); orchestrated as Concerto for Viola and Orchestra (1943); Boosey & Hawkes
     From San Domingo for viola and piano (1945); transcription by William Primrose; Boosey & Hawkes
     Jamaican Rumba for viola and piano (1937); transcription by William Primrose (1944); Boosey & Hawkes; Viola World Publications
     2 Jamaican Street Songs for viola and piano (1944); original for 2 pianos; transcription by William Primrose
        Mattie Rag
        Cookie
     Le Tombeau de Ravel for viola (or clarinet) and piano (1949); Boosey & Hawkes
     Romantic Fantasy for violin, viola and orchestra (1936); Boosey & Hawkes
 George Benjamin (born 1960)
     Viola, Viola for 2 violas (1996); Faber Music
 Ed Bennett (born 1975)
     Excavation for viola and chamber ensemble (2004); Contemporary Music Centre Ireland
     Strange Friction for viola and chamber ensemble (2011)
 Richard Rodney Bennett (1936–2012)
     After Ariadne for viola and piano (1986); Novello & Co.
     Concerto for viola and chamber orchestra (1973); Novello & Co.
     3 Duets for 2 violas (teacher and pupil) (2011); Novello & Co.
     Lady Caroline Lamb, Elegy for viola and orchestra (1972)
     Rondel for viola solo (1996); Novello & Co.
     6 Country Dances for viola and piano (2000); arranged for viola and piano by Veronica Leigh Jacobs; Novello & Co.
     Sonata after Syrinx for flute, viola and harp (1985); Novello & Co.
     Up Bow, Down Bow, Book 2 for viola and piano (1979); Novello & Co.
 William Sterndale Bennett (1816–1875) 
     Romanza for viola and piano (1872); movement III from Symphony in G minor, Op. 43
 Jørgen Bentzon (1897–1951)
     Fabula for viola solo, Op. 42 (1939); Edition Wilhelm Hansen
 Niels Viggo Bentzon (1919–2000)
     Duo for violin and viola, Op. 539 (1989); Edition Wilhelm Hansen
     Sinfonia Concertante for violin, viola, cello, clarinet and orchestra, Op. 100
     Concerto for viola and orchestra, Op. 303 (1972); Edition Wilhelm Hansen
 Esteban Benzecry (born 1970); Esteban Benzecry website
     Adagio Fantastico for violin, viola and string orchestra (1993)
 Nicolai Berezowsky (1900–1953)
     Concerto for viola and orchestra, Op. 28 (1941); Boosey & Hawkes
     Duo for clarinet and viola, Op. 15; Sprague-Coleman
 Jean Berger (1909–2002)
     4 Bagatelles for violin and viola (1983); Neil A. Kjos Music
     Canticle of the Sun for mixed chorus, viola and small percussion (1987); words by Saint Francis of Assisi; J. Sheppard Music Press
     3 Impromptus for violin and viola (1983); Neil A. Kjos Music
     6 Rondeaux for low voice and viola (1968); words by Charles d'Orléans; J. Sheppard Music Press
     Tres canciones for medium voice and piano (or viola and cello) (1968); anonymous poems from the court of Ferdinand and Isabella; J. Sheppard Music Press
     Trio for flute, viola, cello (1986); J. Sheppard Music Press
 Wilhelm Georg Berger (1929–1993)
     Ballata for viola and piano (1954); Editura Muzicală, Bucharest
     Concerto for viola solo, Op. 94 (1990); Editura Muzicală, Bucharest
     Concerto No. 1 for viola and orchestra, Op. 12 (1959); Editura Muzicală, Bucharest
     Concerto No. 2 for viola and orchestra, Op. 16 (1961); Editura Muzicală, Bucharest
     Concerto for violin, viola and orchestra (1978); Editura Muzicală, Bucharest
     3 Sequences Miniaturales for viola solo (1966); Editura Muzicală, Bucharest
     Sonata for flute, viola and cello, Op. 27 (1965); Editura Muzicală, Bucharest
     Sonata for viola solo, Op. 35 (1968); Editura Muzicală, Bucharest
     Sonata for viola and cello, Op. 18 (1962); Editura Muzicală, Bucharest
     Sonata for viola and piano, Op. 3 (1957); Editura Muzicală, Bucharest
     Sonata for violin and viola, Op. 55a (1967); Editura Muzicală, Bucharest
     Sonata quasi una fantasia for viola and piano (1953); Editura Muzicală, Bucharest
 Erik Bergman (1911–2006)
     Nu (Now) for viola and piano, Op. 126 (1994); Edition Fazer; Fennica Gehrman; Warner/Chappell Music Finland
 William Bergsma (1921–1994)
     Fantastic Variations on a Theme from Tristan for viola and piano (1961); Galaxy Music Corporation; ECS Publishing
     Night Piece and Dance Piece for viola and piano (1942)
     Pastorale and Scherzo for recorder or flute and 2 violas (1945); Hargail Music Press; ECS Publishing
 Luciano Berio (1925–2003)
     Alternatim for clarinet, viola and orchestra (1996–1997); Universal Edition
     Chemins II for viola and 9 instruments (1967); Universal Edition
     Chemins III for viola, 9 instruments and orchestra (1968); Universal Edition
     Naturale for viola, percussion and recordings of Sicilian folk music (1985); Universal Edition
     Sequenza VI for viola solo (1967); Universal Edition
     Voci for viola and orchestra (1984); Universal Edition
 Lennox Berkeley (1903–1989)
     3 Pieces for viola solo (1970s)
     Sonata in D minor for viola and piano, Op. 22 (1945); Chester Music
 Michael Berkeley (born 1948)
     Concerto for viola and orchestra (1994, revised 1996); Oxford University Press
     Odd Man Out for viola solo (1994); Oxford University Press
     Tristessa for English horn, viola and orchestra (2003); Oxford University Press
     Variations on Greek Folk-Songs for viola solo (1976); Oxford University Press
 Sol Berkowitz (1922–2006)
     Introduction and Scherzo (Blues and Dance) for viola and piano (1974); Theodore Presser
 Hector Berlioz (1803–1869)
     Harold en Italie (Harold in Italy), Symphony for orchestra with viola obbligato, Op. 16, H. 68 (1834)
 Bart Berman (born 1938)
     Duo in Mediterranean Style for violin and viola (1957)
 Derek Bermel (born 1967)
     Soul Garden for viola and string quintet (2000); Faber Music; PeerMusic Classical
 Alain Bernaud (1932–2020)
     Contrastes for viola and piano (1968); Éditions Rideau Rouge; United Music Publishers
 René Bernier (1905–1984)
     Parabole for viola and piano (1980); CeBeDeM
     Sonatine for violin and viola (1943); Edition Cranz; CeBeDeM
 Wallace Berry (1928–1991)
     Canto lirico for viola and piano (1965); Carl Fischer; Canadian Music Centre
 Marc Berthomieu (1906–1991)
     Florilège musical No. 3 for viola solo; Éditiopns Alphonse Leduc; United Music Publishers
 Moisès Bertran (born 1967)
     Secretos Compartidos, Suite in 5 movements for violin and viola (2012)
     Sonatina líquida for flute, viola and harp (2006); Clivis Publicacions
 Marco Betta (born 1964)
     In ombra d'amore, Ballata for viola solo (1988); Ricordi
     Ultimo canto: In memoria di Francesco Pennisi for viola solo (2001); Ricordi
 Bruno Bettinelli (1913–2004)
     Due Movimenti (2 Movements) for viola and piano (1977); G. Zanibon
 Frank Michael Beyer (1928–2008)
     Concerto "Notte di pasqua" for viola and orchestra (2003–2004, 2006); Bote & Bock
     Melos I for viola solo (1983); Bote & Bock
     Melos II for viola solo (1990); Bote & Bock
     Mysteriensonate for orchestra with viola solo (1986); Bote & Bock
     Sonata for viola and organ (1960); Bärenreiter Verlag
     Trio for oboe, viola and harp (1980); Bote & Bock

Bi
 Günter Bialas (1907–1995)
     Fünf Duette (5 Duets) for viola and cello (1988); Bärenreiter Verlag
     Trauermusik (Funeral Music) for viola and orchestra (1994); Bärenreiter Verlag
 Valentin Bibik (1940–2003)
     Concerto No. 1 for viola and chamber orchestra, Op. 53 (1984); Muzychna Ukraïna
     Concerto No. 2 for viola and orchestra, Op. 104 (1994)
     Concerto-Symphony (Концерт-Симфонія) for violin, viola and chamber orchestra, Op. 61 (1986)
     Elegaic Music (Элегічна музика) for viola and piano soli and orchestra, Op. 77 (1990)
     Out of the Calm... (Из тишины...) for violin, viola and cello, Op. 140 (2000)
     2 Pieces (2 Пьесы) for viola and piano (1962)
     Recitative (Речитатив) for viola solo (1998)
     Sonata No. 1 for viola solo, Op. 31 (1977)
     Sonata No. 2 for viola solo, Op. 136 (1999)
     Sonata No. 1 for viola and piano, Op. 72 (1988)
     Sonata No. 2 for viola and piano, Op. 137 (2000)
     Sounds and Harmonies for viola and piano, Op. 143 (2001)
     Triptych (Триптих) for viola and string orchestra with piano, Op. 35 (1978)
 Helmut Bieler (1940–2019)
     Duo for viola and cello (1989, 1990–1991); original for clarinet and cello; Arends Musikverlag
     Konzentration und Ausbrüche, Concerto for viola and orchestra (1995); Arends Musikverlag
 Eugène Bigot (1888–1965)
     Malinconia for violin or viola
     Thème et variations for viola and piano (1959); Éditions Durand
 Jerry Bilik (born 1933)
     3 Movements for viola and piano (2007)
 Gonchigiin Birvaa (1916–2006)
     Lyric Song (Лирическая песня) for viola and piano (published 1969); Sovetsky Kompozitor
 Chester Biscardi (born 1948)
     The Viola Had Suddenly Become a Voice for viola and piano (2005); Biscardi Music Press
 Keith Bissell (1912–1992)
     Theme, Variation, and Epilogue for soprano, mixed chorus, solo viola and string orchestra (1970); Canadian Music Centre
 Georges Bizet (1838–1875)
     Adagietto from "L'Arlésienne" (1872); transcription for viola and piano by William Primrose

Bj

 Jens Bjerre (1903–1986)
     Purgatorio for viola solo (1964); Edition Samfundet

Bl
  Boris Blacher (1903–1975)
     4 Bagatelles for viola and piano
     Concerto for viola and orchestra, Op. 48 (1954); Bote & Bock; Boosey & Hawkes
 Easley Blackwood (born 1933)
     Sonata No. 1 for viola and piano, Op. 1 (1953); Elkan-Vogel
     Sonata No. 2 for viola and piano, Op. 43 (2001)
 Benjamin Blake (1751–1827).
     6 Duets for violin and viola, Op. 1 (1780)
     Second Set of 6 Duets for violin and viola, Op. 2 (1781)
     Third Set of 6 Duets for violin and viola, Op. 3 (1785)
     3 Solos for viola with cello accompaniment, Op. 9 (c.1825) 
 Howard Blake (born 1938)
     Archangel's Lullaby, Suite for viola and piano, Op. 568 (2006); Highbridge Music
     Aria for viola and piano, Op. 504 (1998); Highbridge Music
     Benedictus, Dramatic Oratorio for tenor, speaker, chorus, solo viola and orchestra, Op. 282 (1980); Highbridge Music
     Paean for viola solo, Op. 405 (1990); Highbridge Music
     Pennillion, Theme and Variations for viola and piano, Op. 570 (2006); original work for violin and harp; Highbridge Music
     Prelude from Benedictus for viola solo, Op. 402 (1980, 1989); Highbridge Music
 Adolphe Blanc (1828–1885)
     Romance No. 2 for viola and piano, Op. 10 (1855)
 Allan Blank (1925–2013)
     Duo for violin and viola (1972); American Composers Alliance
     Five from Seven (En Petite Suite) for viola solo (1985, 2002); American Composers Alliance
     Music for solo viola (2005); American Composers Alliance
     A Set of Opposites for viola and piano (2000); American Composers Alliance
     A Song of Ascents for solo viola (1968–1969); Okra Music; Seesaw Music
     10 Studies for viola solo (2013); American Composers Alliance
     Two Parables by Franz Kafka for voice, violin and viola (1964); American Composers Alliance
     Unfoldings for clarinet, viola and cello (2006); American Composers Alliance
     Variations for clarinet and viola (1959–1960); Okra Music
 Frédéric Blasius (1758–1829)
     Duet for violin and viola (1784?)
     6 Sonatas for clarinet with viola or bass accompaniment, Op. 55 (1805)
 Herbert Blendinger (1936–2020)
     Concerto for viola and orchestra, Op. 38 (1982); Orlando-Musikverlag
     Concerto for viola and string orchestra, Op. 16 No. 1 (1962); Orlando-Musikverlag
     Dialog for viola and percussion, Op. 20 (1968); Orlando-Musikverlag
     Introduktion und Chaconne for viola and organ, Op. 21; Orlando-Musikverlag
     Partita for viola solo, Op. 25 (1974); Orlando-Musikverlag
     Partita for viola and cello, Op. 27 (1972); Orlando-Musikverlag
     Sonata for viola and harpsichord, Op. 13 (1959); Verlag Doblinger
     Sonata for viola and piano, Op. 12 (1958); Verlag Doblinger
     Sonatina for viola and piano (or guitar), Op. 2 No. 1 (1954)
     Suite for flute and viola, Op. 7 (1955)
     Suite for viola solo, Op. 40 (1982); Verlag Doblinger
     Tre Impressioni (3 Impressions) for flute (bass flute), viola and harp, Op. 26 (1976); Orlando-Musikverlag
 Marc Bleuse (born 1937)
     Alternative for viola and piano (1974); Éditions Heugel
     Bairro Alto (Quartier Haut) for viola solo (1995); Éditions Gérard Billaudot
     El Contador for viola solo (1981); Éditions Gérard Billaudot
 William Blezard (1921–2003)
     Duetto for viola and cello soli with string orchestra (1951); Thames Publishing
 Arthur Bliss (1891–1975)
     Intermezzo in E major for viola and piano (1915); transcription by Watson Forbes from Piano Quartet in A major, F. 23; Oxford University Press
     Sonata for viola and piano, F. 91 (1933); Oxford University Press
     Two Nursery Rhymes for voice, clarinet (or viola) and piano, F. 165 (1920); Chester Music
 Ernest Bloch (1880–1959)
     Concertino for flute, viola and string orchestra (or piano), B. 80 (1948, 1950); G. Schirmer
     Meditation and Processional for viola and piano, B. 82 (1951); G. Schirmer
     Suite for viola and piano or orchestra, B. 41 (1919–1920); G. Schirmer
     Suite for viola solo, B. 101 (1958); Broude Brothers
     Suite Hébraïque for viola and piano or orchestra, B. 83 (1951); G. Schirmer
 Karl-Birger Blomdahl (1916–1968)
     Concerto for viola and orchestra (1941); STIM; Swedish Music Information Centre
 Joseph von Blumenthal (1782–1850)
     Grand Caprice in F major for viola solo, Op. 79 (1838)
     3 Grand duos concertantes (C major, D major, F major) for violin and viola, Op. 81 (1839)
 Theodor Blumer (1881–1964)
     Sonata for viola and piano, Op. 17
 Marcus Blunt (1947–2022)
     Sonata for viola and piano (1999, revised 2004); Modus Music
 Carey Blyton (1932–2002)
     Elegy for viola and piano, Op. 12a (1952, revised 1960); Modus Music

Bo
 Leonid Bobylev (b. 1949)
     Concerto for viola and string orchestra (1970)
     Viennese Musical Box (Венская шкатулка), Concerto Grosso No. 3 for violin, viola, piano and string orchestra (2007); Editorial Periferia Música
 Luigi Boccherini (1743–1805)
     Sonata in C major for viola with cello accompaniment, G. 17; Gems Music Publications
     Sonata in C minor for viola with cello accompaniment, G. 18; Gems Music Publications
 Ruth Bodenstein-Hoyme (1924–2006)
     Fünf Miniaturen (5 Miniatures) for violin and viola (1963); Friedrich Hofmeister Musikverlag
 Sylvie Bodorová (b. 1954)
     Gila, Rome! Meditations for viola solo (1980); Panton Praha
     Plankty (Passion Plays), Music for viola and orchestra (1982, revised 2013); Panton Praha
     Silberwolke, Concerto for violin, viola and string orchestra (2005); ArcoDiva
 Jack Body (1944–2015)
     Aeolian Harp for viola solo (1979, 1999); original version for violin solo; Waiteata Music Press
     After Bach for 4 solo violas and 8-part massed violas; also for gamelan, 4 solo violas and massed violas (2001); Commissioned for the 29th International Viola Congress in Wellington, New Zealand; SOUNZ, Center for New Zealand Music
     Three Love Songs for tenor, viola and cello (1968); SOUNZ, Center for New Zealand Music
 August de Boeck (1865–1937)
     Deux esquisses (2 Sketches) for viola (or violin) and piano; Schott Frères, Bruxelles
     Fantasia in G minor for viola and piano (1916); Schott Frères, Bruxelles
     Feuillet d'album (Album Leaf) for viola and piano (c.1892); Schott Frères, Bruxelles
 Konrad Boehmer (1941–2014)
     Nuba for flute, viola and harp (1998); Tonos
 Philippe Boesmans (1936–2022)
     Surfing for viola and orchestra (1990); Éditions Jobert
 Georges Bœuf (1937–2020)
     Noctua, Song for voice and viola, Op. 89 (2004); Symétrie
     Ombres (Shadows) for viola and piano, Op. 94 (2007); Éditions Questions de tempéraments
     Sonata for viola solo, Op. 79 (2002); Éditions Questions de tempéraments
     Territoire des ombres for viola solo, ensemble, and real-time processing and spatialization, Op. 96 (2008)
     Trio for viola, bass clarinet and piano, Op. 78 (2002)
 Emil Bohnke (1888–1928)
     Sonata for viola solo, Op. 13 No. 2 (1921); N. Simrock
 Rob du Bois (1934–2013)
     Drei traurige Tänze (Three Sad Dances) for alto voice and viola (1954); Donemus
     Sonata for viola solo (1981); Donemus
     Three Sad Dances for 2 violas (1954); Donemus
     Ut Supra for viola and piano (1973); Donemus
     Vladimir's Hyde-Away for viola and piano
 René de Boisdeffre (1838–1906)
     Berceuse for viola and piano, Op. 34; Éditions Max Eschig
     Mélodie in A major for viola and piano, Op. 6
     Rêverie in D major for viola (or viola d'amore, or violin, or cello) and string orchestra with harp or piano, Op. 55 (1890?); J. Hamelle
     Trois pièces (3 Pieces) for clarinet or viola and piano, Op. 40 (1873)
 Philippe Boivin (b. 1954)
     Cadence for viola solo (1988); Éditions Salabert
     Concerto for viola and chamber orchestra (1987); Éditions Salabert
     Deux Esquisses (Two Sketches) for violin or viola (1992); Editions du Visage
 William Bolcom (b. 1938)
     Fairytales from the Brothers Grimm for viola, cello and double bass (1987–1988); E.B. Marks Music; Theodore Presser
     Fantasia Concertante for viola, cello and orchestra (1985); E.B. Marks Music; Theodore Presser
     Let Evening Come for soprano, viola and piano (1994); poems by Maya Angelou, Emily Dickinson, Jane Kenyon; E.B. Marks Music; Hal Leonard
     Session II for violin and viola (1966); Merion Music; Theodore Presser
 Victoria Bond (b. 1945)
     Conversation Piece for viola and vibraphone (1975); Seesaw Music; Subito Music
     Duet for flute and viola (1969); Seesaw Music; Subito Music
     Insects for solo electric viola (1996); Protone Music
     Jasmine Flower (茉莉花; Moli Hua) for viola solo (1999); Protone Music
     Mirror, Mirror for soprano, flute and viola (1969); Seesaw Music; Subito Music
     Seduction and Sanctification, Triple Concerto for flute, viola, harp and orchestra (2007); Protone Music
     Woven for violin and viola (2005); also for 2 flutes or 2 violins; Protone Music
 Jacques Bondon (1927–2008)
     Le Soleil multicolore for flute, viola and harp (1970); Éditions Max Eschig
 Joseph-Ermend Bonnal (1880–1944)
     Petit poème (Little Poem) for violin, viola and piano, Op. 29 (1911)
 Adriaan Bonsel (1918–2011)
     Elegie for viola solo (1961); Donemus
 Nimrod Borenstein (b. 1969) 
     Quasi una cadenza for viola solo, Op. 26b (2020)
     Souvenirs for viola and piano, Op. 49 (2019)
 Luigi Borghi (c. 1745 – c. 1806)
     6 Duetti for violin and cello or viola, Op. 5 (1786); also published as Op. 6
 Vadim Borisovsky (1900–1972)
     Concert Etude (Концертный этюд) in A major for viola solo (published 1981); Pieces for Viola Solo, Volume 2 (Пьесы для альта соло, Выпуск 2), Sovetsky Kompozitor
     Vulcan: Sicilian Tarantella (Сицилийская тарантелла “Вулкан”) for viola and piano (1962); Etudes and Virtuoso Pieces (Этюды и виртуозные пьесы), Muzgiz
 Pavel Bořkovec (1894–1972)
     Sonata for viola solo, Op. 12 (1931); Hudební Matice Umělecké Besedy
 Alexander Borodin (1833–1887)
     Nocturne from the String Quartet No. 2 (1881); transcription for viola and piano by William Primrose
 Teresa Borràs i Fornell (1923–2010)
     Concerto for viola and orchestra, Op. 106 (1992)
 Siegfried Borris (1906–1987)
     Canzona for viola and organ (or harpsichord), Op. 110; Sirius Verlag
     Kleine Suite (Little Suite) for viola and piano; Sirius Verlag; Heinrichshofen's Verlag
     Partita for viola and cello (or 2 cellos), Op. 4 (1928); Sirius Verlag; Heinrichshofen's Verlag
     Sonata in F for viola and piano, Op. 51 (published 1950); Sirius Verlag; Heinrichshofen's Verlag
 Edith Borroff (1925–2019)
     Five Pieces for viola and piano (1989); American Composers Alliance
     Trio for viola, horn and piano (1999); American Composers Alliance
     Voices in Exile: Three Canons for flute and viola (1962); American Composers Alliance
 John Borstlap (b. 1950)
     Night Music for viola and piano (1993); Donemus
 Daniel Börtz (b. 1943)
     Dialogo 2 for 2 violas (1978); Carl Gehrmans Musikförlag
 Axel Borup-Jørgensen (1924–2012)
     Autumn Leaves Nr. 5 for viola and marimba, Op. 167 No. 5 (2003); SNYK
     Duo for violin and viola, Op. 12 (1951); Edition A. Borup-Jørgensen; SNYK
     Herbsttag, Paraphrase for viola solo (1996–1999); SNYK
     Mobiler efter Alexander Calder for viola, marimba and piano, Op. 38 (1961); Edition Samfundet
     Musik for slagtøj og bratsch (Music for Percussion and Viola), Op. 18 (1955–1956); Edition Samfundet
     O Bäume Lebens for mezzo-soprano and viola, Op. 81 (1977); Edition Samfundet
     Partita for viola solo, Op. 15 (1953–1954); Edition A. Borup-Jørgensen; SNYK
     Rhapsodie for viola and piano, Op. 114 (1984–1985); version II (1994–1995); version III (1994–1996); Edition A. Borup-Jørgensen; SNYK
     Sine Nomine "Lerchenborg-variation" for viola solo, Op. 139 No. 3 (1990); Edition A. Borup-Jørgensen; SNYK
     Sonata for viola and piano, Op. 14 (1952–1953); Edition A. Borup-Jørgensen; SNYK
     Sonata breve for viola and piano, Op. 33 (1959–1960); Edition A. Borup-Jørgensen; SNYK
     Ur Baul sånger for soprano, flute and viola, Op. 5 (1949); Edition A. Borup-Jørgensen; SNYK
 Hans-Jürgen von Bose (b. 1953)
     ... vom Wege abkommen for viola solo (1981–1982); Ars Viva Verlag
 Jean-Yves Bosseur (b. 1947)
     Alto molto for viola solo (1975, revised 1992); Tonos Musikverlags
 Marco Enrico Bossi (1861–1925)
     Bénédiction nuptiale from Feuillets d'album for viola and piano (or organ), Op. 111 No. 1 (1897)
     Romance in A major for viola (or cello) and piano, Op. 89 (1894); Breitkopf & Härtel
 Will Gay Bottje (1925–2018)
     Fantasy Sonata (Viola Sonata No. 1) for viola and piano (1959); American Composers Alliance
     Mixed Bag for viola and piano; American Composers Alliance
     Rhapsodic Variations for solo viola, piano and string orchestra (1962); American Composers Alliance
     Sonata for violin and viola (2001); American Composers Alliance
 Linda Bouchard (b. 1957)
     4LN for viola, percussion and electronics (2008)
     Booming Sands, Concerto for viola and orchestra (1999); Canadian Music Centre
     Bref for alto flute and viola (2014); Canadian Music Centre
     Circus Faces for flute, viola and cello (1983); Canadian Music Centre
     Possible Nudity for solo viola, cello, string bass, harp and percussion (1987); also for viola, cello and piano (1988); Canadian Music Centre
     Pourtinade for viola and percussion (1983); Canadian Music Centre
     Frisson, La Vie, Duo Concertante for flute, viola and string orchestra (1992); Canadian Music Centre
 Magdeleine Boucherit Le Faure (1879–1960)
     Légende in G major for violin and viola (1933); Éditions Salabert
 Derek Bourgeois (1941–2017)
     Caprice for viola and piano, Op. 119a (1990); original version for alto saxophone and piano; Brass Wind Publications
     Fantasy Duo for viola and double bass, Op. 88 (1983)
     Fantasy Pieces for viola solo, Op. 133b (1993); original version for violin solo; Brass Wind Publications
 Jean-Maurice Bourges (1812–1881)
     Sonata for viola and piano (c.1880)
 Roger Bourland (b. 1952)
     A Slash of Blue for mezzo-soprano, viola and harp (1984); ECS Publishing; Yelton Rhodes Music
     Three Arias for viola or cello and piano (1989); Yelton Rhodes Music
     Portable Concerto for viola and electronics/tape (1989); ECS Publishing; Yelton Rhodes Music
 York Bowen (1884–1961) 
     Allegro de Concert in D minor for viola and piano, Op. 21 No. 2 (1906); original for cello and piano; Josef Weinberger Music Publishing
     Concerto in C minor for viola and orchestra, Op. 25 (1906–1907); Josef Weinberger Music Publishing
     Fantasia in F major for viola and organ (1903); Josef Weinberger Music Publishing
     Fantasia ("Fantasie Quartet") in E minor for 4 violas, Op. 41 No. 1 (1907); Rarities for Strings Publications
     Melody for the C-String in F major for viola and piano, Op. 51 No. 2 (1918); Josef Weinberger Music Publishing
     Melody on the G-String in G major for viola and piano, Op. 47 (1917); Josef Weinberger Music Publishing
     Phantasy in F major for viola and piano, Op. 54 (1918); Josef Weinberger Music Publishing
     Poem in G major for viola, harp and organ, Op. 27 (1912); Josef Weinberger Music Publishing
     Rhapsody in G minor for viola and piano, Op. 149 (1955); Josef Weinberger Music Publishing
     Romance in A major for viola and piano, Op. 21 No. 1 (1908); original for cello and piano; Josef Weinberger Music Publishing
     Romance in D major for viola and piano (1900, 1904); original for violin and piano; Comus Edition
     Sonata No. 1 in C minor for viola and piano, Op. 18 (1905); Edition Schott
     Sonata No. 2 in F major for viola and piano, Op. 22 (1906); Edition Schott
 Anne Boyd (b. 1946)
     Esgid mair for viola and percussion (2003); University of York Music Press; Australian Music Centre
     Miaren mair for oboe d'amore, viola and harp (2004); University of York Music Press
 Rory Boyle (b. 1951)
     4 Dance Preludes for viola and piano (1991); Scottish Music Centre
     3 Islay Sketches for violin and viola (2006); Scottish Music Centre
     Such Sweet Sorrow for viola solo (2009); Scottish Music Centre
  Eugène Bozza (1905–1991)
     Concertino for viola and orchestra (1932); Éditions Paul Ricard
     Concerto for violin, viola and cello soli, winds, harp and double bass (1955); Éditions Alphonse Leduc
     Improvisation Burlesque for viola and piano (1968); Éditions Alphonse Leduc
     Parthie for viola solo (1967); Éditions Alphonse Leduc
     Sonatine for viola and cello (1976); Éditions Alphonse Leduc

 Philip Bračanin (b. 1942)
     Concerto for viola and orchestra (1990); Australian Music Centre
 Merrill Bradshaw (1929–2000)
     Homages, Concerto for viola and small orchestra (1979)
     Love and Death: Four Elizabethan Lyrics for soprano, viola and string orchestra (1984)
     Suite for viola solo (1956)
     Three Sketches for viola solo (1963)
 Timothy Brady (b. 1956)
     Concerto for viola and orchestra (2010–2012); Canadian Music Centre
     Dark Matter (Primal Pulse) for viola solo and chamber ensemble (1998); Canadian Music Centre
     Frame 4: Still for electric guitar and viola (2007); Canadian Music Centre
     Short Conversation(s) with Jennifer T. for viola and marimba (2018) or for viola and piano (2020)
     Struck Twice by Lightning for viola and sampler (or tape) (1999); Canadian Music Centre
     Suddenly for viola and piano (2021)
     Three or Four Days after the Death of Kurt Cobain for viola and piano (1994, 1999); Canadian Music Centre
 Edvard Fliflet Bræin (1924–1976)
     Serenade for viola and orchestra (1947); Edition Harald Lyche
 Johannes Brahms (1833–1897)
     Sonata No. 1 in F minor for viola and piano, Op. 120 No. 1 (1894)
     Sonata No. 2 in E major for viola and piano, Op. 120 No. 2 (1894)
     2 Gesänge (2 Songs) for alto, viola and piano, Op. 91 (1884)
     2 ungarische Tänze (2 Hungarian Dances) – No. 3 in F major and No. 1 in D minor for viola and piano (1869); transcription by Watson Forbes; Hinrichsen Edition; Peters Edition
     Waltz in A major for viola and piano, Op. 39 No. 15 (1865); transcription by Vadim Borisovsky; Album of 6 Pieces, International Music Company
     Wie Melodien zieht es mir (Soft Strains of Music Drifting) for viola and piano, Op. 105 No. 1 (1886); original for voice and piano; transcription by William Primrose; Carl Fischer
     Wir wandelten (We Wandered) for viola and piano, Op. 96 No. 2 (1884); original for voice and piano; transcription by Lionel Tertis; Boosey & Hawkes
 Thüring Bräm (b. 1944)
     "... Dass es nichts Neues gibt unter der Sonne ..." for soprano, viola and bassoon (1970); Schweizer Musikedition
     Marginalien zu einem Anagramm (Marginalia to an Anagram) for violin and viola (1993)
     Ombra for violin, viola and string orchestra (1990)
     One in Two, 5 Pieces for shakuhachi and viola (1998)
 Johann Evangelist Brandl (1760–1837)
     Notturno in E major for 2 violas and cello, Op. 19 (c.1801)
 Theo Brandmüller (1948–2012)
     Au revoir, Monsieur Croche...: Klangfabel nach einem Essay von Claude Debussy for viola and harpsichord (1988); Breitkopf und Härtel
     Cis-Cantus II for viola, cello and double bass (1986); Breitkopf und Härtel
     Imaginations for viola and chamber ensemble (1991); Breitkopf und Härtel
     Konzert auf dem E-Zweig (nach einem Bild von Paul Klee) (Concerto on the "Serious" Branch (after a Painting by Paul Klee)) for viola solo (1991)
     Und der Mond heftet ins Meer ein langes Horn aus Licht und Tanz: 5 kosmische Episoden nach Text-Ideen von F. G. Lorca for viola, cello, double bass and orchestra (1992–1993); Breitkopf und Härtel
 Yehezkel Braun (1922–2014)
     Er'elei Ma'ala (אראלי מעלה; Angels on High; Heavenly Angels), Variations on an Old Tune for viola and piano (2000); Israel Music Institute
     Kinat haShote (קינת השוטה; The Jester's Lament) for viola solo (1968); Israel Music Institute
     Shirei Lilith (שירי לילית; Noctuae Carmina) for viola and piano (1979) or orchestra (1989); Israel Music Institute
     Thirty-Six Progressive Pieces for Two and Three Violas (1995); Israel Music Institute
 Walter Braunfels (1882–1954)
     Schottische Fantasie for viola and orchestra, Op. 47 (1932–1933)
     Music (Sinfonia Concertante) for violin solo, viola solo, 2 horns and string orchestra, Op. 68 (1948)
 Reiner Bredemeyer (1929–1995)
     Concerto for viola and chamber orchestra (1981)
     fUEnfzig fUEr jUErg (Fifty for Jürg) for viola solo (1992)
     Solo 3 for viola and J.K.F. (Jean Kurt Forest) (1975); Deutscher Verlag für Musik
     Sonata for viola and piano (1995)
     Sonata for violin, viola and piano (1967)
     Triostücke for flute, viola and bass clarinet (1962)
     Triostücke 3 in fünf Sätzen for viola, guitar and double bass (1983); Deutscher Verlag für Musik
     Triostücke 4 for clarinet, viola and piano (1985); Deutscher Verlag für Musik
     Varianten for viola, bassoon and piano (1960)
 Ilona Breģe (b. 1959)
     Divi liriski intermeco (2 Lyrical Intermezzos) for viola and piano (1984)
     Otrais Rīgas koncerts (Riga Concerto No. 2) for violin, viola and chamber orchestra (2007)

 Erling Brene (1896–1980)
     Concerto for viola and orchestra (1948–1949); SNYK
 Thérèse Brenet (b. 1935)
     Aeterno certamine for viola, cello, percussion and string orchestra (1990)
     Anamnèse for female voice and viola (1982)
     Anamnèse II for mezzo-soprano, viola and chamber ensemble (1996)
     Les Chants du Sommeil et de la Mort for violin, viola and Celtic harp (1984)
     Ophiucus V.P.8B for viola and guitar (1984)
 Cesar Bresgen (1913–1988)
     Sonata No. 1 for viola and piano (1937); Willy Müller
     Sonata No. 2 for viola and piano (1946); Willy Müller
 Jean-Baptiste Bréval (1753–1823)
     6 Duets for violin and viola, Op. 15 (1784)
 Pierre de Bréville (1861–1949)
     Prière (d'après le Cantique de Molière) for violin (or viola) and organ (1924); Rouart-Lerolle & Cie.
     Sonata for viola and piano (1944); Éditions Max Eschig
 Luc Brewaeys (1959–2015)
     Utopia for 4 violas (2003–2004)
     Violacello for viola and cello (2000)
 Frank Bridge (1879–1941) 
     Allegro appassionato in B minor for viola and piano, H. 82 (1908); Stainer & Bell
     2 Pieces for viola and piano, H. 53 (1905)
        Pensiero in F minor; Stainer & Bell
        Allegretto in A major; final bars left incomplete; completed by Paul Hindmarsh in 1980; Thames Publishing
     2 Pieces for 2 violas, H. 101 (1911–1912)
        Caprice in D major; incomplete
        Lament in C minor; Thames Publishing
     Sonata in D minor for viola and piano, H. 125 (1913–1917); transcription of the Cello Sonata by Veronica Leigh Jacobs; Thames Publishing
     There Is a Willow Grows Aslant a Brook for viola and piano, H. 173 (1927); after Shakespeare’s Hamlet; transcription by Benjamin Britten (1932); Thames Publishing
     3 Songs for voice, viola and piano, H. 76 (1906–1907); Thames Publishing
 Alexander Brincken (b. 1952)
     Concerto Grosso for viola and string orchestra, Op. 15 (1991–1992)
 Benjamin Britten (1913–1976)
     Double Concerto in B minor for violin, viola and orchestra (1932); Oxford University Press; Chester Music
     Elegy for viola solo (1930); Faber Music
     Etude for viola solo (1929)
     Lachrymae – Reflections on a Song by John Dowland for viola and piano, Op. 48 (1950); for viola and string orchestra, Op. 48a (1976); Boosey & Hawkes
     Reflection for viola and piano (1930); Faber Music
     Two Portraits for strings: No. 2 ‘E.B.B.’ for viola and string orchestra (1930); Oxford University Press; Chester Music
 František Xaver Brixi (1732–1771)
     Concerto in C major for viola and orchestra; Edition Schott
 Carolyn Waters Broe
     Rebirth of the Goddess for flute, viola and harp (1992); Classics Unlimited Music
     Tokudo, The Gate of Enlightenment for viola solo (1983); Classics Unlimited Music
 Dirk Brossé (b. 1960)
     Black, White and in Between for violin or viola and string orchestra (1998)
     Hope from Artesia for soprano, viola (or English horn) and piano (2006
 Salvador Brotons (b. 1959)
     Ad Infinitum for flute, viola and harp (1976, revised 1991); Brotons & Mercadal Edicions Musicals; Clivis Publicacions
     Concerto for viola and string orchestra, Op. 106 (2006); Brotons & Mercadal Edicions Musicals
     Sonata for viola and piano, Op. 28 (1982); Brotons & Mercadal Edicions Musicals; Clivis Publicacions
 Alexander Brott (1915–2005)
     Profundum praedictum for viola and string orchestra (1964); Canadian Music Centre
 Bruce Broughton (b. 1945)
     The Fingerprints of Childhood, Trio for flute, violin and viola (2002); Brubel Music
     There Is Always Something to Do (for Morelle) for flute, viola and harp (2011); Fatrock Ink
     Timeline (1945 – ) for horn, viola and piano (2009); Brubel Music
     Tyvek Wood, Trio for flute, viola and harp (1999); Fatrock Ink
 Margaret Brouwer (b. 1940)
     Concerto for viola and orchestra (2009); Pembroke Music
     Dream Drifts for viola (with tape delay) and piano (with percussion) (1983)
     Rhapsodic Sonata for viola and piano (2009); published 2010; Brouwer New Music Publishing
     Two Pieces for viola and piano (1989); Pembroke Music
          X4 – 1 = 0
          Chaconne2
 Stephen Brown (b. 1948)
     The Changeling, Trio for viola, cello and  piano (2017)
     6 Duets for 2 violas (1996); original for 2 violins
     Takkakaw Falls, Suite for viola solo (2003, 2004)
     There Was a Lady in the East, Suite for viola solo (2007)
 František Brož (1896–1962)
     Jarní sonáta (Spring Sonata) for viola and piano, Op. 18 (1946); Orbis
 Max Bruch (1838–1920)
     Canzone in B major for viola and piano, Op. 55 (c.1891); original for cello and orchestra
     Concerto in E minor for clarinet (or violin), viola and orchestra, Op. 88 (1911)
     8 Stücke for clarinet, viola and piano, Op. 83 (1910)
     Kol Nidrei for viola and orchestra, Op. 47 (1880); original for cello and orchestra
     Romanze in F major for viola and orchestra, Op. 85 (1911)
 Gerard von Brucken Fock (1859–1935)
     Sonata in B minor for viola and piano, Op. 5 (1885); Breitkopf & Härtel
 Colin Brumby (1933–2018)
     Abendlied for viola and piano (2001); Wirripang; Australian Music Centre
     Arietta for viola and piano (2010); Wirripang; Australian Music Centre
     Berceuse for trumpet (or viola) and piano (1995); Australian Music Centre
     Chaconne for viola and piano; Australian Music Centre
     Concertino for viola and string orchestra (1960); Australian Music Centre
     Concerto Tre aspetti di Roma for viola and orchestra (1990); Australian Music Centre
     Etude in C minor for viola solo; Australian Music Centre
     Mediterranean Suite for viola quartet and double bass (1956); Australian Music Centre
     Nocturne for viola and piano; Australian Music Centre
     Passacaglia for viola ensemble (7 violas) and piano; Australian Music Centre
     Sonatina for viola and piano (1982); Australian Music Centre
 Herbert Brün (1918–2000)
     on stilts among ducks for viola and tape (1996); Smith Publications, Baltimore
     Sonatina for viola alone, Op. 12 (1950); Smith Publications, Baltimore; Israeli Music Publications; Leeds Music
 Alfred Bruneau (1957–1934)
     Romance in F major for horn (or viola, or cello) and orchestra or piano (1880)
 Gaetano Brunetti (1744–1798)
     Sonata in D major for viola and basso continuo (1789); Amadeus Verlag
 Antonio Bartolomeo Bruni (1757–1821)
     6 Duets for violin and viola, Op. 4
     3 Duets for violin and viola, Op. 25
     6 Duets for violin and viola, Op.  posthumous
     6 Duos for 2 violas (1787)
     3 Sonatas for viola accompanied by viola (or cello), Op. 27 (c.1800)
 Victor Bruns (1904–1996)
     Concerto for viola and orchestra, Op. 69 (1981); Breitkopf & Härtel
     Sonata for viola and piano, Op. 60 (1977); Breitkopf & Härtel
 Mark Brunswick (1902–1971)
     Fantasia for viola solo (1932); New Valley Music Press
 Bjarne Brustad (1895–1978)
     Capricci for violin and viola (1931); Norsk Musikforlag
     Concertino for viola and chamber orchestra (1932); Music Information Centre Norway
     Norsk Suite (Norwegian Suite) for viola and piano (1926); Edition Harald Lyche
     Partita for viola solo (1931, revised 1957); Music Information Centre Norway
 Joanna Bruzdowicz (1943–2021)
     Fantasia Hermantica sur le Thème S-A-B-B-E for viola and piano (1979)
 Gavin Bryars (b. 1943)
     Epilogue from Wonderlawn for solo viola, electric guitar, bass clarinet, 3 cellos and double bass (1994)
     From Mina Harker's Journal for baritone and viola (1994)
     Lauda (con Sordino) for cello or viola, piano and optional electric guitar (2002); Edition Schott
     The North Shore for viola and piano (1993); Edition Schott
     The Old Tower of Löbenicht for solo violin or viola and ensemble (1987); Edition Schott
 Benedikt Brydern (b. 1966)
     Bebop for Beagles for violin and viola (2007)
     From My Notebook, Volume 2 for violin and viola (2001)
     Hollywood Nocturne for flute, viola and harp (2004); Fat Rock Ink
     Pedestrian Crossing for 4 violas (1999); Gems Music Publications
     Strings in Paradise for 4 violas, drums and bass (1998)
     Strings on Vacation, Mini Tone Poem for 4 violas, clarinet and bassoon (1999)
     Tales From The Bavarian Woods for 2 violins and viola (2002)

Bu
 Valentino Bucchi (1916–1976)
     Concerto di Concerti for string orchestra with violin, viola, cello and double bass obligati (1974); Carisch, Milano
     Soliloquios, Monodrama for viola solo (1976); Associazione Musicale Valentino Bucchi
 Thomas Buchholz (b. 1961)
     Fluxion III "Letzte Wache" (Fluxion III "The Last Guard") for English horn, viola and bassoon (1994); Ebert Musik Verlag
     Frühlingstrio (Spring Trio) for violin, viola and piano (1999); Ebert Musik Verlag
     Lacrymæ, Concerto for viola and mixed chorus a cappella (2002); Verlag Neue Musik
     Trio for violin, viola and organ (2004); original for violin, cello and organ; Ebert Musik Verlag
     Zwei Rhapsodien (2 Rhapsodies) for viola and guitar (1990); Verlag Neue Musik
 Gunnar Bucht (b. 1927)
     Concerto de Marle for viola and orchestra (1998); STIM; Swedish Music Information Centre
     Sinfonia Concertante for flute, viola, harp and orchestra (1981–1982); STIM; Swedish Music Information Centre
 Linda Buckley (b. 1979)
     do you remember the planets? for viola and tape (2004); Contemporary Music Centre Ireland
 Walter Buczynski (b. 1933)
     Lyric VII for viola and orchestra (1991)
     Sonata No. 2 for viola and piano (1982); Canadian Music Centre
 Antonio (Antonino) Buenaventura (1904–1996)
     Sonata for viola and piano (1969)
 Glenn Buhr (b. 1954)
     Cantilène elégiaque for viola and harp (1982); Canadian Music Centre
     Concerto for viola and orchestra (1994); Canadian Music Centre
     Variazioni for viola and piano (1989); Canadian Music Centre
 Zbigniew Bujarski  (1933–2018)
     Lęk ptaków (The Fear of Birds) for violin, viola and percussion (1993); Polskie Wydawnictwo Muzyczne
 Pyotr Bulakhov (1822–1885)
     Barcarolle (Баркарола) for 2 violas and piano; transcription by Vadim Borisovsky (1950);  (State Music Publishing House); Leeds Music
     Canzonetta (Канцонетта) for viola and piano; transcription by Vadim Borisovsky (1946)
 Edvard Hagerup Bull (1922–2012)
     Duo for viola and piano, Op. 44b (1973); Music Information Centre Norway
     3 Morceaux Brefs for viola and orchestra (or piano), Op. 17b (1955); Music Information Centre Norway
 Kenji Bunch (b. 1973)
     3 American Folk Hymn Settings for 2 violas (2001, 2008); original for 2 violins; Kenji Bunch Music Publishing
     The 3 G's for solo viola (2005); Kenji Bunch Music Publishing
     Common Tones for violin/viola, horn and piano (2000); Kenji Bunch Music Publishing
     Cookbook for viola and piano (2004, 2006); original for clarinet and piano; Kenji Bunch Music Publishing
     Crawl Space for viola solo (1996, 2004); original for cello solo; Kenji Bunch Music Publishing
     The Devil's Box for viola and orchestra (2011); Kenji Bunch Music Publishing
     Drift...an Eventual Lullaby for clarinet, viola, and piano (2006); Kenji Bunch Music Publishing
     The Eternal Return for viola solo (2011); Kenji Bunch Music Publishing
     From the Verdant Kingdom, Duo for viola and vibraphone (2009); Kenji Bunch Music Publishing
     Ghost Reel for violin, viola (doubling jaw harp) and banjo (2006); Kenji Bunch Music Publishing
     The Golden Apples of the Sun for viola and chamber orchestra (2006); Kenji Bunch Music Publishing
     Hobgoblinry for viola and harpsichord (2002); Kenji Bunch Music Publishing
     I Dream in Evergreen for viola and piano (2008); Kenji Bunch Music Publishing
     laissez vibrer... for viola and celeste (1998); Kenji Bunch Music Publishing
     Lost and Found for viola and percussion (2010); Kenji Bunch Music Publishing
     Rise (and Shine) for viola ensemble (2016)
     Suite for viola and piano (1998); Kenji Bunch Music Publishing
     Until Next Time for viola solo (2010); Kenji Bunch Music Publishing
     Verso for violin, viola, string orchestra and harpsichord (2010); Kenji Bunch Music Publishing
 Revol Bunin (1924–1976)
     Concerto in G major for viola and orchestra, Op. 22 (1953);  (State Music Publishing House)
     Poem for viola and orchestra (1952)
     Sonata in D minor for viola and piano, Op. 26 (1955); Sovetsky Kompozitor
     Suite for viola and piano (1955)
 John Burge (b. 1961)
     String Theory for viola and piano (2012); Canadian Music Centre
 Jarmil Burghauser (1921–1997)
     Sonata for viola and piano (1985); Český Hudební Fond
 Geoffrey Burgon (1941–2010)
     Concerto "Ghosts of the Dance" for viola and orchestra (2008); Chester Music
     Six Studies for viola solo (1980, 2000); original for cello solo; Chester Music
     Songs of Mary for mezzo-soprano, viola and piano (1970); Chester Music
 Caleb Burhans (b. 1980)
     Going Home to Venus for viola solo (2002); Burning Hands Publishing
     Keymaster for flute, viola and harp (2005); Burning Hands Publishing
     On the Wings of Mercury for oboe and viola (2003); Burning Hands Publishing
     Unspeakable Truths for viola and CD (2007); Burning Hands Publishing
     You Could Hear It Touch the Viking for viola solo (2007); Burning Hands Publishing
 Willy Burkhard (1900–1955)
     Concerto for viola and orchestra, Op. 93 (1953–1954); Bärenreiter Verlag
     Kleine Serenade for violin and viola, Op. 15 (1927); Bärenreiter Verlag
     Sonata for solo viola, Op. 59 (1939); Claves; Bärenreiter Verlag
 Willy Burmester (1869–1933)
     Französisches Lied aus dem 18. Jahrhundert (French Air from the 18th Century) for viola and piano (1909); original for violin and piano; adaptation by Lionel Tertis; Edition Schott
 Diana Burrell (b. 1948)
     Concerto “...calling, leaping, crying, dancing...” for viola and orchestra (1994); United Music Publishers
     Songs for Harvey for viola solo (1988); United Music Publishers
 Benjamin Burrows (1891–1966)
     Lament and Gigue for viola and piano (1927); Augener
     On Shadowy Waters for viola and piano (1919); Augener
     Sonata for viola and piano (1932–1933); British Music Information Centre
 Mervyn Burtch (1929–2015)
     Duo for viola and harp; Welsh Music Information Centre
     Phantasy for viola solo (1995); Welsh Music Information Centre
     Sonata for viola and piano (2004); Welsh Music Information Centre
 Gerald Busby (b. 1935)
     Viola, Aria from the Chamber Opera Orpheus in Love for mezzo-soprano and viola (1982); words by Craig Lucas
 Adolf Busch (1891–1952)
     3 Lieder for high voice, viola, and piano, Op. 3a
     3 Lieder for high voice, viola, and piano, Op. 23b (1917)
     Suite in A minor for viola solo, Op. 16a; Amadeus Verlag
 Alan Bush (1900–1995)
     Sonatina for viola and piano, Op. 88 (1978); N. Simrock
     Three Contrapuntal Studies for violin and viola, Op. 13 (1929)
     Two Melodies for viola and piano, Op. 47 (1957); Joseph Williams
 Ferruccio Busoni (1866–1924)
     Albumblatt (Album Leaf) in E minor for viola and piano, BV 272 (1916); original for flute (or violin) and piano; adaptation by Paul Klengel; Breitkopf & Härtel
 Howard J. Buss (b. 1951)
     Duo for viola and bassoon (1977)
     Reverie for clarinet, viola and piano (1992); Brixton Publications
     Tennessee Suite for flute, viola and piano (2002); Brixton Publications
 Henri Büsser (1872–1973)
     Appassionato in C minor for viola and piano, Op. 34 (1910); United Music Publishers
     Catalane sur des airs populaires for viola and orchestra or piano, Op. 78 (1926); Henry Lemoine
     Rhapsodie arménienne sur des thèmes populaire in B minor for viola and piano, Op. 81 (1930); Éditions Alphonse Leduc; United Music Publishers
 Sylvano Bussotti (1931–2021)
     Culbianco e Capinera for viola solo (1986); G. Ricordi
     Intermezzo for viola and orchestra (1984); first movement from Il Catalogo è questo III [Trittico]; G. Ricordi
     Nudino for viola and piano (1937, 1984); G. Ricordi
     Nudo disteso, Cadenza for viola solo (1980); G. Ricordi
     Ping-pong-gemello for violin and viola (1992)
 Martin Butler (b. 1960)
     Walden Snow for viola and piano (2004); Oxford University Press; Goodmusic Publishing
 Yuri Butsko (1938–2015)
     Concerto No. 2 "Discourse on War and Peace" (Рассуждение о Войне и Мире) for viola and orchestra (2001); Muzyka Moscow
     Sonata for viola and piano (1976); Sovetsky Kompozitor; Sikorski
 Nigel Butterley (1935–2022)
     Forest I for viola and piano (1990); Australian Music Centre
 Arthur Butterworth (1923–2014)
     Bubu for English horn, viola and harp, Op. 107 (1999)
     Pastorale for viola and piano, Op. 112 (2002); Comus Edition
     Sonata for viola and piano, Op. 78 (1986); Comus Edition
     Suite for viola and cello, Op. 13 (1951); Hinrichsen Edition; Edition Peters
     Concerto for viola and orchestra, Op. 82 (1988–1992); Comus Edition

By
 Garrett Byrnes (b. 1971)
     Capriccio improvviso for viola and piano (2013); Musica Cosmopolita
     Devil in Moscow for viola and harpsichord (2009); Musica Cosmopolita
     Nanna's Lament for viola solo (1999); Musica Cosmopolita
 Britta Byström (b. 1977)
     Dream Day for viola solo (2013); Edition Wilhelm Hansen
     Four Walks for viola and double bass (2017); Edition Wilhelm Hansen
     A Walk after Dark for viola and orchestra (2013); Edition Wilhelm Hansen

References

External links
 Free scores featuring the viola at the International Music Score Library Project

 
Viola A-B